

28001–28100 

|-bgcolor=#d6d6d6
| 28001 ||  || — || November 29, 1997 || Socorro || LINEAR || — || align=right | 6.7 km || 
|-id=002 bgcolor=#d6d6d6
| 28002 ||  || — || November 29, 1997 || Socorro || LINEAR || HYG || align=right | 9.3 km || 
|-id=003 bgcolor=#d6d6d6
| 28003 ||  || — || November 29, 1997 || Socorro || LINEAR || — || align=right | 7.8 km || 
|-id=004 bgcolor=#E9E9E9
| 28004 Terakawa || 1997 XA ||  || December 2, 1997 || Mishima || M. Akiyama || PAE || align=right | 6.0 km || 
|-id=005 bgcolor=#d6d6d6
| 28005 || 1997 XC || — || December 1, 1997 || Lime Creek || R. Linderholm || — || align=right | 15 km || 
|-id=006 bgcolor=#fefefe
| 28006 ||  || — || December 3, 1997 || Gekko || T. Kagawa, T. Urata || — || align=right | 5.8 km || 
|-id=007 bgcolor=#d6d6d6
| 28007 Galhassin ||  ||  || December 7, 1997 || Cima Ekar || A. Boattini, M. Tombelli || — || align=right | 7.1 km || 
|-id=008 bgcolor=#E9E9E9
| 28008 ||  || — || December 5, 1997 || Nachi-Katsuura || Y. Shimizu, T. Urata || — || align=right | 6.8 km || 
|-id=009 bgcolor=#d6d6d6
| 28009 ||  || — || December 21, 1997 || Oizumi || T. Kobayashi || — || align=right | 5.9 km || 
|-id=010 bgcolor=#d6d6d6
| 28010 ||  || — || December 24, 1997 || Oizumi || T. Kobayashi || — || align=right | 6.4 km || 
|-id=011 bgcolor=#E9E9E9
| 28011 ||  || — || December 22, 1997 || Xinglong || SCAP || — || align=right | 5.0 km || 
|-id=012 bgcolor=#d6d6d6
| 28012 ||  || — || December 23, 1997 || Xinglong || SCAP || KOR || align=right | 4.1 km || 
|-id=013 bgcolor=#E9E9E9
| 28013 ||  || — || December 24, 1997 || Xinglong || SCAP || — || align=right | 3.8 km || 
|-id=014 bgcolor=#d6d6d6
| 28014 ||  || — || December 25, 1997 || Oizumi || T. Kobayashi || — || align=right | 9.1 km || 
|-id=015 bgcolor=#d6d6d6
| 28015 ||  || — || December 26, 1997 || Church Stretton || S. P. Laurie || — || align=right | 7.6 km || 
|-id=016 bgcolor=#d6d6d6
| 28016 ||  || — || December 30, 1997 || Oizumi || T. Kobayashi || URS || align=right | 17 km || 
|-id=017 bgcolor=#FA8072
| 28017 ||  || — || December 31, 1997 || Oizumi || T. Kobayashi || — || align=right | 6.0 km || 
|-id=018 bgcolor=#d6d6d6
| 28018 || 1998 AG || — || January 4, 1998 || Xinglong || SCAP || — || align=right | 8.3 km || 
|-id=019 bgcolor=#fefefe
| 28019 Warchal ||  ||  || January 14, 1998 || Ondřejov || L. Kotková || FLO || align=right | 1.9 km || 
|-id=020 bgcolor=#fefefe
| 28020 ||  || — || January 22, 1998 || Kitt Peak || Spacewatch || V || align=right | 2.4 km || 
|-id=021 bgcolor=#d6d6d6
| 28021 ||  || — || January 22, 1998 || Bédoin || P. Antonini || — || align=right | 9.7 km || 
|-id=022 bgcolor=#d6d6d6
| 28022 ||  || — || January 25, 1998 || Haleakala || NEAT || VER || align=right | 14 km || 
|-id=023 bgcolor=#d6d6d6
| 28023 ||  || — || January 23, 1998 || Socorro || LINEAR || EOS || align=right | 5.9 km || 
|-id=024 bgcolor=#d6d6d6
| 28024 ||  || — || January 25, 1998 || Nachi-Katsuura || Y. Shimizu, T. Urata || EOS || align=right | 11 km || 
|-id=025 bgcolor=#E9E9E9
| 28025 ||  || — || January 25, 1998 || Haleakala || NEAT || — || align=right | 3.2 km || 
|-id=026 bgcolor=#E9E9E9
| 28026 ||  || — || February 6, 1998 || Xinglong || SCAP || NEM || align=right | 9.8 km || 
|-id=027 bgcolor=#fefefe
| 28027 ||  || — || February 6, 1998 || La Silla || E. W. Elst || V || align=right | 2.5 km || 
|-id=028 bgcolor=#d6d6d6
| 28028 ||  || — || February 22, 1998 || Xinglong || SCAP || KOR || align=right | 5.7 km || 
|-id=029 bgcolor=#d6d6d6
| 28029 ||  || — || February 20, 1998 || Woomera || F. B. Zoltowski || 7:4 || align=right | 16 km || 
|-id=030 bgcolor=#d6d6d6
| 28030 ||  || — || February 26, 1998 || Kleť || Kleť Obs. || — || align=right | 8.4 km || 
|-id=031 bgcolor=#E9E9E9
| 28031 ||  || — || February 23, 1998 || Kitt Peak || Spacewatch || — || align=right | 3.7 km || 
|-id=032 bgcolor=#E9E9E9
| 28032 ||  || — || February 17, 1998 || Nachi-Katsuura || Y. Shimizu, T. Urata || — || align=right | 8.5 km || 
|-id=033 bgcolor=#d6d6d6
| 28033 ||  || — || March 5, 1998 || Xinglong || SCAP || EOS || align=right | 5.8 km || 
|-id=034 bgcolor=#E9E9E9
| 28034 ||  || — || March 1, 1998 || La Silla || E. W. Elst || MRX || align=right | 4.2 km || 
|-id=035 bgcolor=#fefefe
| 28035 ||  || — || March 21, 1998 || Kitt Peak || Spacewatch || — || align=right | 2.2 km || 
|-id=036 bgcolor=#d6d6d6
| 28036 ||  || — || March 20, 1998 || Socorro || LINEAR || EOS || align=right | 9.6 km || 
|-id=037 bgcolor=#fefefe
| 28037 Williammonts ||  ||  || March 20, 1998 || Socorro || LINEAR || — || align=right | 4.8 km || 
|-id=038 bgcolor=#fefefe
| 28038 Nicoleodzer ||  ||  || March 20, 1998 || Socorro || LINEAR || NYS || align=right | 1.5 km || 
|-id=039 bgcolor=#fefefe
| 28039 Mauraoei ||  ||  || March 24, 1998 || Socorro || LINEAR || FLO || align=right | 3.8 km || 
|-id=040 bgcolor=#d6d6d6
| 28040 ||  || — || March 24, 1998 || Socorro || LINEAR || HYG || align=right | 7.5 km || 
|-id=041 bgcolor=#d6d6d6
| 28041 ||  || — || March 24, 1998 || Socorro || LINEAR || — || align=right | 16 km || 
|-id=042 bgcolor=#fefefe
| 28042 Mayapatel ||  ||  || March 24, 1998 || Socorro || LINEAR || FLO || align=right | 2.1 km || 
|-id=043 bgcolor=#fefefe
| 28043 Mabelwheeler ||  ||  || March 24, 1998 || Socorro || LINEAR || — || align=right | 3.0 km || 
|-id=044 bgcolor=#fefefe
| 28044 ||  || — || March 31, 1998 || Socorro || LINEAR || V || align=right | 3.6 km || 
|-id=045 bgcolor=#fefefe
| 28045 Johnwilkins ||  ||  || March 31, 1998 || Socorro || LINEAR || V || align=right | 2.1 km || 
|-id=046 bgcolor=#fefefe
| 28046 ||  || — || April 24, 1998 || Haleakala || NEAT || — || align=right | 5.5 km || 
|-id=047 bgcolor=#fefefe
| 28047 ||  || — || April 21, 1998 || Socorro || LINEAR || — || align=right | 2.3 km || 
|-id=048 bgcolor=#fefefe
| 28048 Camilleyoke ||  ||  || April 21, 1998 || Socorro || LINEAR || — || align=right | 2.4 km || 
|-id=049 bgcolor=#E9E9E9
| 28049 Yvonnealex ||  ||  || April 21, 1998 || Socorro || LINEAR || GEF || align=right | 3.4 km || 
|-id=050 bgcolor=#fefefe
| 28050 Asekomeh ||  ||  || April 21, 1998 || Socorro || LINEAR || FLO || align=right | 2.9 km || 
|-id=051 bgcolor=#d6d6d6
| 28051 Bruzzone ||  ||  || April 25, 1998 || Anderson Mesa || LONEOS || KOR || align=right | 4.1 km || 
|-id=052 bgcolor=#E9E9E9
| 28052 Lowellputnam ||  ||  || May 18, 1998 || Anderson Mesa || LONEOS || — || align=right | 3.0 km || 
|-id=053 bgcolor=#E9E9E9
| 28053 Kimberlyputnam ||  ||  || May 22, 1998 || Anderson Mesa || LONEOS || — || align=right | 7.9 km || 
|-id=054 bgcolor=#d6d6d6
| 28054 ||  || — || May 23, 1998 || Socorro || LINEAR || — || align=right | 8.7 km || 
|-id=055 bgcolor=#E9E9E9
| 28055 || 1998 MX || — || June 16, 1998 || Socorro || LINEAR || EUN || align=right | 4.3 km || 
|-id=056 bgcolor=#E9E9E9
| 28056 ||  || — || June 20, 1998 || Kitt Peak || Spacewatch || EUN || align=right | 7.7 km || 
|-id=057 bgcolor=#d6d6d6
| 28057 Hollars ||  ||  || June 24, 1998 || Anderson Mesa || LONEOS || — || align=right | 11 km || 
|-id=058 bgcolor=#fefefe
| 28058 || 1998 NF || — || July 1, 1998 || Reedy Creek || J. Broughton || NYS || align=right | 2.8 km || 
|-id=059 bgcolor=#d6d6d6
| 28059 Kiliaan ||  ||  || July 26, 1998 || La Silla || E. W. Elst || — || align=right | 8.6 km || 
|-id=060 bgcolor=#d6d6d6
| 28060 ||  || — || July 26, 1998 || La Silla || E. W. Elst || — || align=right | 13 km || 
|-id=061 bgcolor=#d6d6d6
| 28061 ||  || — || July 26, 1998 || La Silla || E. W. Elst || KOR || align=right | 5.8 km || 
|-id=062 bgcolor=#fefefe
| 28062 ||  || — || July 22, 1998 || Reedy Creek || J. Broughton || V || align=right | 2.1 km || 
|-id=063 bgcolor=#E9E9E9
| 28063 ||  || — || July 26, 1998 || La Silla || E. W. Elst || — || align=right | 3.7 km || 
|-id=064 bgcolor=#d6d6d6
| 28064 ||  || — || August 17, 1998 || Socorro || LINEAR || EOS || align=right | 11 km || 
|-id=065 bgcolor=#fefefe
| 28065 ||  || — || August 17, 1998 || Socorro || LINEAR || NYS || align=right | 3.6 km || 
|-id=066 bgcolor=#fefefe
| 28066 ||  || — || August 17, 1998 || Socorro || LINEAR || — || align=right | 2.6 km || 
|-id=067 bgcolor=#E9E9E9
| 28067 ||  || — || August 17, 1998 || Socorro || LINEAR || EUN || align=right | 5.4 km || 
|-id=068 bgcolor=#fefefe
| 28068 Stephbillings ||  ||  || August 17, 1998 || Socorro || LINEAR || FLO || align=right | 2.3 km || 
|-id=069 bgcolor=#E9E9E9
| 28069 ||  || — || August 17, 1998 || Socorro || LINEAR || — || align=right | 3.0 km || 
|-id=070 bgcolor=#d6d6d6
| 28070 ||  || — || August 17, 1998 || Socorro || LINEAR || — || align=right | 4.8 km || 
|-id=071 bgcolor=#E9E9E9
| 28071 ||  || — || August 25, 1998 || Višnjan Observatory || Višnjan Obs. || — || align=right | 4.7 km || 
|-id=072 bgcolor=#fefefe
| 28072 Lindbowerman ||  ||  || August 17, 1998 || Socorro || LINEAR || NYS || align=right | 2.7 km || 
|-id=073 bgcolor=#E9E9E9
| 28073 Fohner ||  ||  || August 17, 1998 || Socorro || LINEAR || — || align=right | 3.7 km || 
|-id=074 bgcolor=#d6d6d6
| 28074 Matgallagher ||  ||  || August 17, 1998 || Socorro || LINEAR || — || align=right | 4.2 km || 
|-id=075 bgcolor=#fefefe
| 28075 Emilyhoffman ||  ||  || August 17, 1998 || Socorro || LINEAR || — || align=right | 3.1 km || 
|-id=076 bgcolor=#fefefe
| 28076 ||  || — || August 17, 1998 || Socorro || LINEAR || — || align=right | 2.2 km || 
|-id=077 bgcolor=#fefefe
| 28077 Hard ||  ||  || August 27, 1998 || Anderson Mesa || LONEOS || — || align=right | 2.2 km || 
|-id=078 bgcolor=#fefefe
| 28078 Mauricehilleman ||  ||  || August 26, 1998 || Caussols || ODAS || — || align=right | 2.6 km || 
|-id=079 bgcolor=#d6d6d6
| 28079 ||  || — || August 24, 1998 || Socorro || LINEAR || — || align=right | 17 km || 
|-id=080 bgcolor=#E9E9E9
| 28080 ||  || — || August 24, 1998 || Socorro || LINEAR || EUN || align=right | 2.7 km || 
|-id=081 bgcolor=#fefefe
| 28081 Carriehudson ||  ||  || August 24, 1998 || Socorro || LINEAR || — || align=right | 2.4 km || 
|-id=082 bgcolor=#E9E9E9
| 28082 ||  || — || August 24, 1998 || Socorro || LINEAR || EUN || align=right | 5.3 km || 
|-id=083 bgcolor=#fefefe
| 28083 ||  || — || August 28, 1998 || Socorro || LINEAR || — || align=right | 3.6 km || 
|-id=084 bgcolor=#fefefe
| 28084 ||  || — || August 28, 1998 || Socorro || LINEAR || — || align=right | 2.4 km || 
|-id=085 bgcolor=#FA8072
| 28085 ||  || — || August 28, 1998 || Socorro || LINEAR || — || align=right | 3.5 km || 
|-id=086 bgcolor=#E9E9E9
| 28086 ||  || — || August 26, 1998 || La Silla || E. W. Elst || HEN || align=right | 6.7 km || 
|-id=087 bgcolor=#fefefe
| 28087 ||  || — || August 26, 1998 || La Silla || E. W. Elst || — || align=right | 2.4 km || 
|-id=088 bgcolor=#fefefe
| 28088 ||  || — || September 14, 1998 || Socorro || LINEAR || — || align=right | 2.4 km || 
|-id=089 bgcolor=#d6d6d6
| 28089 ||  || — || September 14, 1998 || Socorro || LINEAR || — || align=right | 6.7 km || 
|-id=090 bgcolor=#fefefe
| 28090 ||  || — || September 14, 1998 || Socorro || LINEAR || — || align=right | 1.4 km || 
|-id=091 bgcolor=#fefefe
| 28091 Mikekane ||  ||  || September 14, 1998 || Socorro || LINEAR || FLO || align=right | 2.1 km || 
|-id=092 bgcolor=#fefefe
| 28092 Joannekear ||  ||  || September 14, 1998 || Socorro || LINEAR || — || align=right | 2.0 km || 
|-id=093 bgcolor=#fefefe
| 28093 Staceylevoit ||  ||  || September 14, 1998 || Socorro || LINEAR || — || align=right | 2.8 km || 
|-id=094 bgcolor=#E9E9E9
| 28094 Michellewis ||  ||  || September 14, 1998 || Socorro || LINEAR || — || align=right | 2.9 km || 
|-id=095 bgcolor=#fefefe
| 28095 Seanmahoney ||  ||  || September 14, 1998 || Socorro || LINEAR || — || align=right | 2.5 km || 
|-id=096 bgcolor=#fefefe
| 28096 Kathrynmarsh ||  ||  || September 14, 1998 || Socorro || LINEAR || FLO || align=right | 1.8 km || 
|-id=097 bgcolor=#d6d6d6
| 28097 ||  || — || September 14, 1998 || Socorro || LINEAR || KOR || align=right | 3.5 km || 
|-id=098 bgcolor=#fefefe
| 28098 ||  || — || September 14, 1998 || Socorro || LINEAR || NYS || align=right | 2.2 km || 
|-id=099 bgcolor=#d6d6d6
| 28099 ||  || — || September 14, 1998 || Socorro || LINEAR || — || align=right | 10 km || 
|-id=100 bgcolor=#E9E9E9
| 28100 ||  || — || September 14, 1998 || Socorro || LINEAR || — || align=right | 4.3 km || 
|}

28101–28200 

|-bgcolor=#fefefe
| 28101 ||  || — || September 14, 1998 || Socorro || LINEAR || FLO || align=right | 1.9 km || 
|-id=102 bgcolor=#fefefe
| 28102 ||  || — || September 14, 1998 || Socorro || LINEAR || — || align=right | 1.8 km || 
|-id=103 bgcolor=#fefefe
| 28103 Benmcpheron ||  ||  || September 14, 1998 || Socorro || LINEAR || NYS || align=right | 2.4 km || 
|-id=104 bgcolor=#fefefe
| 28104 ||  || — || September 16, 1998 || Caussols || ODAS || — || align=right | 1.7 km || 
|-id=105 bgcolor=#E9E9E9
| 28105 Santallo ||  ||  || September 18, 1998 || Caussols || ODAS || ADE || align=right | 6.7 km || 
|-id=106 bgcolor=#fefefe
| 28106 ||  || — || September 16, 1998 || Caussols || ODAS || — || align=right | 2.5 km || 
|-id=107 bgcolor=#E9E9E9
| 28107 Sapar ||  ||  || September 22, 1998 || Ondřejov || L. Kotková || — || align=right | 4.5 km || 
|-id=108 bgcolor=#fefefe
| 28108 Sydneybarnes ||  ||  || September 17, 1998 || Anderson Mesa || LONEOS || — || align=right | 1.8 km || 
|-id=109 bgcolor=#d6d6d6
| 28109 ||  || — || September 18, 1998 || Kitt Peak || Spacewatch || — || align=right | 9.5 km || 
|-id=110 bgcolor=#fefefe
| 28110 ||  || — || September 19, 1998 || Kitt Peak || Spacewatch || — || align=right | 3.9 km || 
|-id=111 bgcolor=#fefefe
| 28111 ||  || — || September 20, 1998 || Kitt Peak || Spacewatch || — || align=right | 2.1 km || 
|-id=112 bgcolor=#fefefe
| 28112 ||  || — || September 21, 1998 || Kitt Peak || Spacewatch || NYS || align=right | 2.1 km || 
|-id=113 bgcolor=#fefefe
| 28113 ||  || — || September 23, 1998 || Xinglong || SCAP || — || align=right | 2.7 km || 
|-id=114 bgcolor=#fefefe
| 28114 ||  || — || September 23, 1998 || Xinglong || SCAP || V || align=right | 3.0 km || 
|-id=115 bgcolor=#fefefe
| 28115 ||  || — || September 26, 1998 || Kitt Peak || Spacewatch || NYS || align=right | 2.1 km || 
|-id=116 bgcolor=#E9E9E9
| 28116 Drewbarringer ||  ||  || September 17, 1998 || Anderson Mesa || LONEOS || — || align=right | 11 km || 
|-id=117 bgcolor=#fefefe
| 28117 Mort ||  ||  || September 17, 1998 || Anderson Mesa || LONEOS || FLO || align=right | 2.3 km || 
|-id=118 bgcolor=#fefefe
| 28118 Vaux ||  ||  || September 17, 1998 || Anderson Mesa || LONEOS || — || align=right | 2.7 km || 
|-id=119 bgcolor=#fefefe
| 28119 ||  || — || September 21, 1998 || La Silla || E. W. Elst || — || align=right | 2.4 km || 
|-id=120 bgcolor=#fefefe
| 28120 ||  || — || September 21, 1998 || La Silla || E. W. Elst || FLO || align=right | 2.2 km || 
|-id=121 bgcolor=#fefefe
| 28121 ||  || — || September 21, 1998 || La Silla || E. W. Elst || — || align=right | 2.3 km || 
|-id=122 bgcolor=#E9E9E9
| 28122 ||  || — || September 21, 1998 || La Silla || E. W. Elst || — || align=right | 5.6 km || 
|-id=123 bgcolor=#fefefe
| 28123 ||  || — || September 21, 1998 || La Silla || E. W. Elst || NYS || align=right | 2.9 km || 
|-id=124 bgcolor=#E9E9E9
| 28124 ||  || — || September 26, 1998 || Socorro || LINEAR || — || align=right | 4.0 km || 
|-id=125 bgcolor=#fefefe
| 28125 Juliomiguez ||  ||  || September 26, 1998 || Socorro || LINEAR || — || align=right | 2.7 km || 
|-id=126 bgcolor=#fefefe
| 28126 Nydegger ||  ||  || September 26, 1998 || Socorro || LINEAR || FLO || align=right | 3.1 km || 
|-id=127 bgcolor=#fefefe
| 28127 Ogden-Stenerson ||  ||  || September 26, 1998 || Socorro || LINEAR || — || align=right | 2.1 km || 
|-id=128 bgcolor=#fefefe
| 28128 Cynthrossman ||  ||  || September 26, 1998 || Socorro || LINEAR || — || align=right | 2.0 km || 
|-id=129 bgcolor=#fefefe
| 28129 Teresummers ||  ||  || September 26, 1998 || Socorro || LINEAR || FLO || align=right | 3.5 km || 
|-id=130 bgcolor=#fefefe
| 28130 Troemper ||  ||  || September 26, 1998 || Socorro || LINEAR || NYS || align=right | 2.5 km || 
|-id=131 bgcolor=#fefefe
| 28131 Dougwelch ||  ||  || September 26, 1998 || Socorro || LINEAR || — || align=right | 2.2 km || 
|-id=132 bgcolor=#fefefe
| 28132 Karenzobel ||  ||  || September 26, 1998 || Socorro || LINEAR || V || align=right | 3.2 km || 
|-id=133 bgcolor=#fefefe
| 28133 Kylebardwell ||  ||  || September 26, 1998 || Socorro || LINEAR || — || align=right | 3.4 km || 
|-id=134 bgcolor=#E9E9E9
| 28134 ||  || — || September 26, 1998 || Socorro || LINEAR || — || align=right | 4.8 km || 
|-id=135 bgcolor=#fefefe
| 28135 ||  || — || September 26, 1998 || Socorro || LINEAR || — || align=right | 3.2 km || 
|-id=136 bgcolor=#fefefe
| 28136 Chasegross ||  ||  || September 26, 1998 || Socorro || LINEAR || — || align=right | 1.9 km || 
|-id=137 bgcolor=#fefefe
| 28137 Helenyao ||  ||  || September 26, 1998 || Socorro || LINEAR || V || align=right | 2.4 km || 
|-id=138 bgcolor=#d6d6d6
| 28138 ||  || — || September 26, 1998 || Socorro || LINEAR || EOS || align=right | 7.7 km || 
|-id=139 bgcolor=#d6d6d6
| 28139 ||  || — || September 26, 1998 || Socorro || LINEAR || EOS || align=right | 5.5 km || 
|-id=140 bgcolor=#fefefe
| 28140 ||  || — || September 20, 1998 || La Silla || E. W. Elst || — || align=right | 3.3 km || 
|-id=141 bgcolor=#fefefe
| 28141 ten Brummelaar || 1998 TC ||  || October 2, 1998 || Anderson Mesa || LONEOS || — || align=right | 8.0 km || 
|-id=142 bgcolor=#fefefe
| 28142 || 1998 TU || — || October 12, 1998 || Kitt Peak || Spacewatch || FLO || align=right | 1.9 km || 
|-id=143 bgcolor=#fefefe
| 28143 ||  || — || October 13, 1998 || Višnjan Observatory || K. Korlević || V || align=right | 3.0 km || 
|-id=144 bgcolor=#fefefe
| 28144 ||  || — || October 13, 1998 || Kitt Peak || Spacewatch || FLO || align=right | 4.0 km || 
|-id=145 bgcolor=#E9E9E9
| 28145 ||  || — || October 14, 1998 || Xinglong || SCAP || — || align=right | 3.2 km || 
|-id=146 bgcolor=#fefefe
| 28146 Nackard ||  ||  || October 11, 1998 || Anderson Mesa || LONEOS || FLO || align=right | 4.7 km || 
|-id=147 bgcolor=#fefefe
| 28147 Colbath ||  ||  || October 11, 1998 || Anderson Mesa || LONEOS || FLO || align=right | 3.8 km || 
|-id=148 bgcolor=#fefefe
| 28148 Fuentes ||  ||  || October 14, 1998 || Anderson Mesa || LONEOS || FLO || align=right | 1.8 km || 
|-id=149 bgcolor=#fefefe
| 28149 Arieldaniel ||  ||  || October 14, 1998 || Anderson Mesa || LONEOS || V || align=right | 1.6 km || 
|-id=150 bgcolor=#fefefe
| 28150 ||  || — || October 17, 1998 || Ondřejov || P. Pravec || FLO || align=right | 2.0 km || 
|-id=151 bgcolor=#E9E9E9
| 28151 Markknopfler ||  ||  || October 22, 1998 || Caussols || ODAS || — || align=right | 4.9 km || 
|-id=152 bgcolor=#fefefe
| 28152 ||  || — || October 24, 1998 || Oizumi || T. Kobayashi || — || align=right | 3.1 km || 
|-id=153 bgcolor=#fefefe
| 28153 ||  || — || October 29, 1998 || Višnjan Observatory || K. Korlević || FLO || align=right | 2.2 km || 
|-id=154 bgcolor=#d6d6d6
| 28154 ||  || — || October 18, 1998 || La Silla || E. W. Elst || — || align=right | 11 km || 
|-id=155 bgcolor=#fefefe
| 28155 Chengzhendai ||  ||  || October 28, 1998 || Socorro || LINEAR || FLO || align=right | 2.3 km || 
|-id=156 bgcolor=#d6d6d6
| 28156 McColl ||  ||  || October 28, 1998 || Socorro || LINEAR || — || align=right | 6.4 km || 
|-id=157 bgcolor=#E9E9E9
| 28157 ||  || — || November 11, 1998 || Caussols || ODAS || — || align=right | 3.4 km || 
|-id=158 bgcolor=#fefefe
| 28158 ||  || — || November 12, 1998 || Oizumi || T. Kobayashi || — || align=right | 2.7 km || 
|-id=159 bgcolor=#fefefe
| 28159 Giuricich ||  ||  || November 10, 1998 || Socorro || LINEAR || FLO || align=right | 2.4 km || 
|-id=160 bgcolor=#fefefe
| 28160 ||  || — || November 10, 1998 || Socorro || LINEAR || — || align=right | 2.6 km || 
|-id=161 bgcolor=#fefefe
| 28161 Neelpatel ||  ||  || November 10, 1998 || Socorro || LINEAR || — || align=right | 1.8 km || 
|-id=162 bgcolor=#fefefe
| 28162 ||  || — || November 10, 1998 || Socorro || LINEAR || — || align=right | 5.1 km || 
|-id=163 bgcolor=#fefefe
| 28163 Lorikim ||  ||  || November 10, 1998 || Socorro || LINEAR || — || align=right | 5.7 km || 
|-id=164 bgcolor=#fefefe
| 28164 ||  || — || November 10, 1998 || Socorro || LINEAR || — || align=right | 2.1 km || 
|-id=165 bgcolor=#fefefe
| 28165 Bayanmashat ||  ||  || November 10, 1998 || Socorro || LINEAR || FLO || align=right | 3.4 km || 
|-id=166 bgcolor=#fefefe
| 28166 ||  || — || November 10, 1998 || Socorro || LINEAR || — || align=right | 1.7 km || 
|-id=167 bgcolor=#fefefe
| 28167 Andrewkim ||  ||  || November 10, 1998 || Socorro || LINEAR || — || align=right | 3.6 km || 
|-id=168 bgcolor=#fefefe
| 28168 Evanolin ||  ||  || November 10, 1998 || Socorro || LINEAR || — || align=right | 3.0 km || 
|-id=169 bgcolor=#fefefe
| 28169 Cathconte ||  ||  || November 10, 1998 || Socorro || LINEAR || — || align=right | 6.2 km || 
|-id=170 bgcolor=#fefefe
| 28170 ||  || — || November 10, 1998 || Socorro || LINEAR || — || align=right | 2.3 km || 
|-id=171 bgcolor=#fefefe
| 28171 Diannahu ||  ||  || November 10, 1998 || Socorro || LINEAR || NYS || align=right | 2.3 km || 
|-id=172 bgcolor=#E9E9E9
| 28172 ||  || — || November 10, 1998 || Socorro || LINEAR || EUN || align=right | 7.1 km || 
|-id=173 bgcolor=#fefefe
| 28173 Hisakichi ||  ||  || November 11, 1998 || Chichibu || N. Satō || NYS || align=right | 2.3 km || 
|-id=174 bgcolor=#E9E9E9
| 28174 Harue ||  ||  || November 12, 1998 || Chichibu || N. Satō || — || align=right | 5.3 km || 
|-id=175 bgcolor=#E9E9E9
| 28175 ||  || — || November 15, 1998 || Oizumi || T. Kobayashi || — || align=right | 2.6 km || 
|-id=176 bgcolor=#fefefe
| 28176 ||  || — || November 15, 1998 || Kitt Peak || Spacewatch || — || align=right | 1.2 km || 
|-id=177 bgcolor=#fefefe
| 28177 ||  || — || November 14, 1998 || Socorro || LINEAR || — || align=right | 5.8 km || 
|-id=178 bgcolor=#fefefe
| 28178 ||  || — || November 18, 1998 || Oizumi || T. Kobayashi || V || align=right | 3.0 km || 
|-id=179 bgcolor=#fefefe
| 28179 ||  || — || November 18, 1998 || Oizumi || T. Kobayashi || FLO || align=right | 2.8 km || 
|-id=180 bgcolor=#fefefe
| 28180 ||  || — || November 18, 1998 || Oizumi || T. Kobayashi || — || align=right | 4.7 km || 
|-id=181 bgcolor=#fefefe
| 28181 ||  || — || November 19, 1998 || Nachi-Katsuura || Y. Shimizu, T. Urata || — || align=right | 3.0 km || 
|-id=182 bgcolor=#fefefe
| 28182 Chadharris ||  ||  || November 21, 1998 || Socorro || LINEAR || NYS || align=right | 2.5 km || 
|-id=183 bgcolor=#fefefe
| 28183 Naidu ||  ||  || November 21, 1998 || Socorro || LINEAR || — || align=right | 4.6 km || 
|-id=184 bgcolor=#fefefe
| 28184 Vaishnavirao ||  ||  || November 21, 1998 || Socorro || LINEAR || FLO || align=right | 2.0 km || 
|-id=185 bgcolor=#fefefe
| 28185 ||  || — || November 21, 1998 || Socorro || LINEAR || — || align=right | 3.8 km || 
|-id=186 bgcolor=#fefefe
| 28186 ||  || — || November 21, 1998 || Socorro || LINEAR || — || align=right | 2.6 km || 
|-id=187 bgcolor=#E9E9E9
| 28187 ||  || — || November 23, 1998 || Socorro || LINEAR || MAR || align=right | 5.1 km || 
|-id=188 bgcolor=#E9E9E9
| 28188 ||  || — || November 25, 1998 || Socorro || LINEAR || — || align=right | 8.2 km || 
|-id=189 bgcolor=#E9E9E9
| 28189 ||  || — || November 18, 1998 || Socorro || LINEAR || — || align=right | 5.2 km || 
|-id=190 bgcolor=#E9E9E9
| 28190 ||  || — || November 25, 1998 || Socorro || LINEAR || — || align=right | 14 km || 
|-id=191 bgcolor=#E9E9E9
| 28191 ||  || — || November 25, 1998 || Socorro || LINEAR || — || align=right | 5.7 km || 
|-id=192 bgcolor=#d6d6d6
| 28192 ||  || — || November 25, 1998 || Socorro || LINEAR || — || align=right | 9.3 km || 
|-id=193 bgcolor=#fefefe
| 28193 Italosvevo ||  ||  || November 29, 1998 || Farra d'Isonzo || Farra d'Isonzo || FLO || align=right | 2.2 km || 
|-id=194 bgcolor=#fefefe
| 28194 ||  || — || November 21, 1998 || Kitt Peak || Spacewatch || — || align=right | 2.0 km || 
|-id=195 bgcolor=#fefefe
| 28195 ||  || — || December 12, 1998 || Oizumi || T. Kobayashi || — || align=right | 3.7 km || 
|-id=196 bgcolor=#fefefe
| 28196 Szeged ||  ||  || December 15, 1998 || Piszkéstető || K. Sárneczky, L. Kiss || V || align=right | 3.1 km || 
|-id=197 bgcolor=#fefefe
| 28197 ||  || — || December 15, 1998 || High Point || D. K. Chesney || V || align=right | 2.2 km || 
|-id=198 bgcolor=#d6d6d6
| 28198 ||  || — || December 15, 1998 || Višnjan Observatory || K. Korlević || — || align=right | 5.7 km || 
|-id=199 bgcolor=#fefefe
| 28199 ||  || — || December 14, 1998 || Socorro || LINEAR || — || align=right | 9.9 km || 
|-id=200 bgcolor=#fefefe
| 28200 ||  || — || December 14, 1998 || Socorro || LINEAR || V || align=right | 3.4 km || 
|}

28201–28300 

|-bgcolor=#fefefe
| 28201 Lifubin ||  ||  || December 14, 1998 || Socorro || LINEAR || FLO || align=right | 3.7 km || 
|-id=202 bgcolor=#fefefe
| 28202 ||  || — || December 14, 1998 || Socorro || LINEAR || NYS || align=right | 2.4 km || 
|-id=203 bgcolor=#FA8072
| 28203 ||  || — || December 14, 1998 || Socorro || LINEAR || — || align=right | 1.8 km || 
|-id=204 bgcolor=#fefefe
| 28204 Liyakang ||  ||  || December 14, 1998 || Socorro || LINEAR || NYS || align=right | 2.3 km || 
|-id=205 bgcolor=#fefefe
| 28205 ||  || — || December 14, 1998 || Socorro || LINEAR || — || align=right | 1.8 km || 
|-id=206 bgcolor=#fefefe
| 28206 Haozhongning ||  ||  || December 14, 1998 || Socorro || LINEAR || — || align=right | 3.2 km || 
|-id=207 bgcolor=#E9E9E9
| 28207 Blakesmith ||  ||  || December 14, 1998 || Socorro || LINEAR || — || align=right | 3.0 km || 
|-id=208 bgcolor=#E9E9E9
| 28208 Timtrippel ||  ||  || December 14, 1998 || Socorro || LINEAR || — || align=right | 4.1 km || 
|-id=209 bgcolor=#E9E9E9
| 28209 Chatterjee ||  ||  || December 14, 1998 || Socorro || LINEAR || — || align=right | 5.2 km || 
|-id=210 bgcolor=#fefefe
| 28210 Howardfeng ||  ||  || December 14, 1998 || Socorro || LINEAR || — || align=right | 2.2 km || 
|-id=211 bgcolor=#fefefe
| 28211 ||  || — || December 14, 1998 || Socorro || LINEAR || — || align=right | 2.9 km || 
|-id=212 bgcolor=#fefefe
| 28212 ||  || — || December 15, 1998 || Socorro || LINEAR || — || align=right | 2.3 km || 
|-id=213 bgcolor=#fefefe
| 28213 ||  || — || December 15, 1998 || Socorro || LINEAR || — || align=right | 4.3 km || 
|-id=214 bgcolor=#fefefe
| 28214 || 1998 YW || — || December 16, 1998 || Oizumi || T. Kobayashi || — || align=right | 1.8 km || 
|-id=215 bgcolor=#fefefe
| 28215 ||  || — || December 16, 1998 || Gekko || T. Kagawa || V || align=right | 3.2 km || 
|-id=216 bgcolor=#fefefe
| 28216 ||  || — || December 17, 1998 || Višnjan Observatory || K. Korlević || NYS || align=right | 3.3 km || 
|-id=217 bgcolor=#fefefe
| 28217 ||  || — || December 18, 1998 || Kleť || Kleť Obs. || V || align=right | 2.6 km || 
|-id=218 bgcolor=#fefefe
| 28218 ||  || — || December 17, 1998 || Višnjan Observatory || K. Korlević || FLO || align=right | 2.4 km || 
|-id=219 bgcolor=#E9E9E9
| 28219 ||  || — || December 23, 1998 || Višnjan Observatory || K. Korlević || — || align=right | 4.0 km || 
|-id=220 bgcolor=#E9E9E9
| 28220 York ||  ||  || December 28, 1998 || Kleť || J. Tichá, M. Tichý || — || align=right | 2.5 km || 
|-id=221 bgcolor=#d6d6d6
| 28221 ||  || — || December 22, 1998 || Kitt Peak || Spacewatch || KOR || align=right | 4.5 km || 
|-id=222 bgcolor=#fefefe
| 28222 Neilpathak ||  ||  || December 16, 1998 || Socorro || LINEAR || FLO || align=right | 3.5 km || 
|-id=223 bgcolor=#E9E9E9
| 28223 ||  || — || December 27, 1998 || Nyukasa || M. Hirasawa, S. Suzuki || — || align=right | 6.4 km || 
|-id=224 bgcolor=#fefefe
| 28224 || 1999 AJ || — || January 5, 1999 || Višnjan Observatory || K. Korlević || NYS || align=right | 2.2 km || 
|-id=225 bgcolor=#E9E9E9
| 28225 || 1999 AS || — || January 7, 1999 || Oizumi || T. Kobayashi || — || align=right | 4.1 km || 
|-id=226 bgcolor=#E9E9E9
| 28226 ||  || — || January 9, 1999 || Oizumi || T. Kobayashi || HNA || align=right | 4.7 km || 
|-id=227 bgcolor=#fefefe
| 28227 ||  || — || January 9, 1999 || Oizumi || T. Kobayashi || FLO || align=right | 3.6 km || 
|-id=228 bgcolor=#E9E9E9
| 28228 ||  || — || January 9, 1999 || Oizumi || T. Kobayashi || — || align=right | 5.7 km || 
|-id=229 bgcolor=#fefefe
| 28229 ||  || — || January 9, 1999 || Višnjan Observatory || K. Korlević || V || align=right | 2.5 km || 
|-id=230 bgcolor=#fefefe
| 28230 ||  || — || January 10, 1999 || Nachi-Katsuura || Y. Shimizu, T. Urata || — || align=right | 7.1 km || 
|-id=231 bgcolor=#E9E9E9
| 28231 ||  || — || January 10, 1999 || Nachi-Katsuura || Y. Shimizu, T. Urata || HNS || align=right | 4.3 km || 
|-id=232 bgcolor=#E9E9E9
| 28232 ||  || — || January 12, 1999 || Oizumi || T. Kobayashi || — || align=right | 4.6 km || 
|-id=233 bgcolor=#E9E9E9
| 28233 ||  || — || January 12, 1999 || Oizumi || T. Kobayashi || — || align=right | 4.9 km || 
|-id=234 bgcolor=#d6d6d6
| 28234 ||  || — || January 13, 1999 || Oizumi || T. Kobayashi || — || align=right | 11 km || 
|-id=235 bgcolor=#fefefe
| 28235 Kasparvonbraun ||  ||  || January 7, 1999 || Anderson Mesa || LONEOS || — || align=right | 2.8 km || 
|-id=236 bgcolor=#d6d6d6
| 28236 ||  || — || January 14, 1999 || Višnjan Observatory || K. Korlević || KOR || align=right | 4.8 km || 
|-id=237 bgcolor=#E9E9E9
| 28237 ||  || — || January 10, 1999 || Kitt Peak || Spacewatch || — || align=right | 3.0 km || 
|-id=238 bgcolor=#d6d6d6
| 28238 ||  || — || January 11, 1999 || Kitt Peak || Spacewatch || KOR || align=right | 3.9 km || 
|-id=239 bgcolor=#d6d6d6
| 28239 ||  || — || January 13, 1999 || Kitt Peak || Spacewatch || EOS || align=right | 5.6 km || 
|-id=240 bgcolor=#fefefe
| 28240 ||  || — || January 14, 1999 || Višnjan Observatory || K. Korlević || — || align=right | 6.6 km || 
|-id=241 bgcolor=#E9E9E9
| 28241 ||  || — || January 10, 1999 || Xinglong || SCAP || — || align=right | 4.9 km || 
|-id=242 bgcolor=#fefefe
| 28242 Mingantu ||  ||  || January 6, 1999 || Xinglong || SCAP || — || align=right | 3.6 km || 
|-id=243 bgcolor=#fefefe
| 28243 ||  || — || January 15, 1999 || Oizumi || T. Kobayashi || — || align=right | 3.1 km || 
|-id=244 bgcolor=#E9E9E9
| 28244 ||  || — || January 14, 1999 || Kitt Peak || Spacewatch || — || align=right | 3.5 km || 
|-id=245 bgcolor=#E9E9E9
| 28245 Cruise ||  ||  || January 14, 1999 || Anderson Mesa || LONEOS || — || align=right | 3.9 km || 
|-id=246 bgcolor=#E9E9E9
| 28246 ||  || — || January 18, 1999 || Višnjan Observatory || K. Korlević || — || align=right | 9.5 km || 
|-id=247 bgcolor=#fefefe
| 28247 ||  || — || January 19, 1999 || Višnjan Observatory || K. Korlević || EUT || align=right | 2.3 km || 
|-id=248 bgcolor=#E9E9E9
| 28248 Barthelemy ||  ||  || January 19, 1999 || Caussols || ODAS || — || align=right | 4.4 km || 
|-id=249 bgcolor=#d6d6d6
| 28249 ||  || — || January 21, 1999 || Caussols || ODAS || — || align=right | 13 km || 
|-id=250 bgcolor=#d6d6d6
| 28250 ||  || — || January 22, 1999 || Višnjan Observatory || K. Korlević || — || align=right | 6.1 km || 
|-id=251 bgcolor=#d6d6d6
| 28251 Gerbaldi ||  ||  || January 20, 1999 || Caussols || ODAS || KOR || align=right | 4.2 km || 
|-id=252 bgcolor=#E9E9E9
| 28252 ||  || — || January 26, 1999 || Višnjan Observatory || K. Korlević || ADE || align=right | 7.8 km || 
|-id=253 bgcolor=#E9E9E9
| 28253 ||  || — || January 16, 1999 || Socorro || LINEAR || MAR || align=right | 5.0 km || 
|-id=254 bgcolor=#fefefe
| 28254 Raghrama ||  ||  || January 16, 1999 || Socorro || LINEAR || — || align=right | 7.0 km || 
|-id=255 bgcolor=#fefefe
| 28255 ||  || — || January 18, 1999 || Socorro || LINEAR || FLO || align=right | 2.5 km || 
|-id=256 bgcolor=#fefefe
| 28256 ||  || — || January 18, 1999 || Socorro || LINEAR || V || align=right | 3.9 km || 
|-id=257 bgcolor=#E9E9E9
| 28257 ||  || — || January 18, 1999 || Socorro || LINEAR || — || align=right | 14 km || 
|-id=258 bgcolor=#fefefe
| 28258 ||  || — || January 18, 1999 || Socorro || LINEAR || — || align=right | 3.4 km || 
|-id=259 bgcolor=#fefefe
| 28259 ||  || — || January 17, 1999 || Kitt Peak || Spacewatch || V || align=right | 2.4 km || 
|-id=260 bgcolor=#d6d6d6
| 28260 ||  || — || January 18, 1999 || Kitt Peak || Spacewatch || — || align=right | 8.4 km || 
|-id=261 bgcolor=#d6d6d6
| 28261 || 1999 CJ || — || February 4, 1999 || Oizumi || T. Kobayashi || EOS || align=right | 9.5 km || 
|-id=262 bgcolor=#d6d6d6
| 28262 ||  || — || February 8, 1999 || Višnjan Observatory || K. Korlević || — || align=right | 9.1 km || 
|-id=263 bgcolor=#E9E9E9
| 28263 ||  || — || February 8, 1999 || Višnjan Observatory || K. Korlević || — || align=right | 6.5 km || 
|-id=264 bgcolor=#d6d6d6
| 28264 ||  || — || February 12, 1999 || Oizumi || T. Kobayashi || EOS || align=right | 6.4 km || 
|-id=265 bgcolor=#E9E9E9
| 28265 ||  || — || February 12, 1999 || Oizumi || T. Kobayashi || — || align=right | 6.1 km || 
|-id=266 bgcolor=#E9E9E9
| 28266 ||  || — || February 12, 1999 || Oizumi || T. Kobayashi || — || align=right | 4.6 km || 
|-id=267 bgcolor=#fefefe
| 28267 ||  || — || February 15, 1999 || Oizumi || T. Kobayashi || NYS || align=right | 8.8 km || 
|-id=268 bgcolor=#fefefe
| 28268 ||  || — || February 8, 1999 || Uenohara || N. Kawasato || — || align=right | 2.9 km || 
|-id=269 bgcolor=#E9E9E9
| 28269 ||  || — || February 15, 1999 || Višnjan Observatory || K. Korlević || EUN || align=right | 5.4 km || 
|-id=270 bgcolor=#d6d6d6
| 28270 ||  || — || February 15, 1999 || Višnjan Observatory || K. Korlević || KOR || align=right | 4.8 km || 
|-id=271 bgcolor=#d6d6d6
| 28271 ||  || — || February 6, 1999 || Višnjan Observatory || K. Korlević || KAR || align=right | 3.6 km || 
|-id=272 bgcolor=#fefefe
| 28272 Mikejanner ||  ||  || February 10, 1999 || Socorro || LINEAR || — || align=right | 3.2 km || 
|-id=273 bgcolor=#E9E9E9
| 28273 Maianhvu ||  ||  || February 10, 1999 || Socorro || LINEAR || — || align=right | 3.1 km || 
|-id=274 bgcolor=#E9E9E9
| 28274 ||  || — || February 10, 1999 || Socorro || LINEAR || EUN || align=right | 3.9 km || 
|-id=275 bgcolor=#d6d6d6
| 28275 Quoc-Bao ||  ||  || February 10, 1999 || Socorro || LINEAR || — || align=right | 7.9 km || 
|-id=276 bgcolor=#fefefe
| 28276 Filipnaiser ||  ||  || February 10, 1999 || Socorro || LINEAR || NYS || align=right | 2.1 km || 
|-id=277 bgcolor=#fefefe
| 28277 Chengherngyi ||  ||  || February 10, 1999 || Socorro || LINEAR || V || align=right | 2.9 km || 
|-id=278 bgcolor=#d6d6d6
| 28278 ||  || — || February 10, 1999 || Socorro || LINEAR || EOS || align=right | 6.6 km || 
|-id=279 bgcolor=#d6d6d6
| 28279 ||  || — || February 10, 1999 || Socorro || LINEAR || — || align=right | 15 km || 
|-id=280 bgcolor=#fefefe
| 28280 ||  || — || February 10, 1999 || Socorro || LINEAR || — || align=right | 3.1 km || 
|-id=281 bgcolor=#E9E9E9
| 28281 ||  || — || February 10, 1999 || Socorro || LINEAR || EUN || align=right | 10 km || 
|-id=282 bgcolor=#d6d6d6
| 28282 ||  || — || February 10, 1999 || Socorro || LINEAR || EOS || align=right | 9.2 km || 
|-id=283 bgcolor=#d6d6d6
| 28283 ||  || — || February 10, 1999 || Socorro || LINEAR || — || align=right | 7.5 km || 
|-id=284 bgcolor=#E9E9E9
| 28284 ||  || — || February 10, 1999 || Socorro || LINEAR || — || align=right | 7.5 km || 
|-id=285 bgcolor=#E9E9E9
| 28285 ||  || — || February 10, 1999 || Socorro || LINEAR || — || align=right | 4.9 km || 
|-id=286 bgcolor=#E9E9E9
| 28286 ||  || — || February 10, 1999 || Socorro || LINEAR || — || align=right | 10 km || 
|-id=287 bgcolor=#d6d6d6
| 28287 Osmanov ||  ||  || February 10, 1999 || Socorro || LINEAR || KOR || align=right | 4.8 km || 
|-id=288 bgcolor=#d6d6d6
| 28288 ||  || — || February 10, 1999 || Socorro || LINEAR || TEL || align=right | 4.4 km || 
|-id=289 bgcolor=#d6d6d6
| 28289 ||  || — || February 10, 1999 || Socorro || LINEAR || THM || align=right | 10 km || 
|-id=290 bgcolor=#E9E9E9
| 28290 ||  || — || February 10, 1999 || Socorro || LINEAR || GEF || align=right | 5.6 km || 
|-id=291 bgcolor=#fefefe
| 28291 ||  || — || February 10, 1999 || Socorro || LINEAR || V || align=right | 5.7 km || 
|-id=292 bgcolor=#E9E9E9
| 28292 ||  || — || February 10, 1999 || Socorro || LINEAR || — || align=right | 7.4 km || 
|-id=293 bgcolor=#fefefe
| 28293 ||  || — || February 10, 1999 || Socorro || LINEAR || — || align=right | 4.1 km || 
|-id=294 bgcolor=#d6d6d6
| 28294 ||  || — || February 12, 1999 || Socorro || LINEAR || NAEslow || align=right | 10 km || 
|-id=295 bgcolor=#E9E9E9
| 28295 Heyizheng ||  ||  || February 12, 1999 || Socorro || LINEAR || — || align=right | 6.4 km || 
|-id=296 bgcolor=#d6d6d6
| 28296 ||  || — || February 12, 1999 || Socorro || LINEAR || — || align=right | 5.2 km || 
|-id=297 bgcolor=#d6d6d6
| 28297 ||  || — || February 12, 1999 || Socorro || LINEAR || — || align=right | 9.4 km || 
|-id=298 bgcolor=#E9E9E9
| 28298 ||  || — || February 12, 1999 || Socorro || LINEAR || — || align=right | 8.3 km || 
|-id=299 bgcolor=#fefefe
| 28299 Kanghaoyan ||  ||  || February 12, 1999 || Socorro || LINEAR || FLO || align=right | 3.7 km || 
|-id=300 bgcolor=#d6d6d6
| 28300 ||  || — || February 12, 1999 || Socorro || LINEAR || — || align=right | 6.4 km || 
|}

28301–28400 

|-bgcolor=#E9E9E9
| 28301 ||  || — || February 12, 1999 || Socorro || LINEAR || DOR || align=right | 11 km || 
|-id=302 bgcolor=#d6d6d6
| 28302 ||  || — || February 12, 1999 || Socorro || LINEAR || — || align=right | 11 km || 
|-id=303 bgcolor=#E9E9E9
| 28303 ||  || — || February 12, 1999 || Socorro || LINEAR || — || align=right | 8.5 km || 
|-id=304 bgcolor=#E9E9E9
| 28304 ||  || — || February 12, 1999 || Socorro || LINEAR || — || align=right | 6.3 km || 
|-id=305 bgcolor=#E9E9E9
| 28305 Wangjiayi ||  ||  || February 12, 1999 || Socorro || LINEAR || — || align=right | 4.9 km || 
|-id=306 bgcolor=#d6d6d6
| 28306 ||  || — || February 12, 1999 || Socorro || LINEAR || VER || align=right | 11 km || 
|-id=307 bgcolor=#E9E9E9
| 28307 ||  || — || February 12, 1999 || Socorro || LINEAR || — || align=right | 6.7 km || 
|-id=308 bgcolor=#E9E9E9
| 28308 ||  || — || February 12, 1999 || Socorro || LINEAR || — || align=right | 4.1 km || 
|-id=309 bgcolor=#fefefe
| 28309 Ericfein ||  ||  || February 12, 1999 || Socorro || LINEAR || — || align=right | 8.3 km || 
|-id=310 bgcolor=#d6d6d6
| 28310 ||  || — || February 12, 1999 || Socorro || LINEAR || — || align=right | 8.6 km || 
|-id=311 bgcolor=#E9E9E9
| 28311 ||  || — || February 10, 1999 || Socorro || LINEAR || — || align=right | 3.1 km || 
|-id=312 bgcolor=#d6d6d6
| 28312 ||  || — || February 10, 1999 || Socorro || LINEAR || TEL || align=right | 4.4 km || 
|-id=313 bgcolor=#d6d6d6
| 28313 ||  || — || February 10, 1999 || Socorro || LINEAR || — || align=right | 9.2 km || 
|-id=314 bgcolor=#d6d6d6
| 28314 ||  || — || February 10, 1999 || Socorro || LINEAR || KOR || align=right | 5.2 km || 
|-id=315 bgcolor=#d6d6d6
| 28315 ||  || — || February 10, 1999 || Socorro || LINEAR || — || align=right | 6.4 km || 
|-id=316 bgcolor=#d6d6d6
| 28316 ||  || — || February 10, 1999 || Socorro || LINEAR || — || align=right | 8.0 km || 
|-id=317 bgcolor=#E9E9E9
| 28317 Aislinndeely ||  ||  || February 12, 1999 || Socorro || LINEAR || HEN || align=right | 2.7 km || 
|-id=318 bgcolor=#fefefe
| 28318 Janecox ||  ||  || February 12, 1999 || Socorro || LINEAR || FLO || align=right | 3.0 km || 
|-id=319 bgcolor=#E9E9E9
| 28319 ||  || — || February 12, 1999 || Socorro || LINEAR || — || align=right | 3.9 km || 
|-id=320 bgcolor=#d6d6d6
| 28320 ||  || — || February 12, 1999 || Socorro || LINEAR || TIR || align=right | 6.1 km || 
|-id=321 bgcolor=#fefefe
| 28321 Arnabdey ||  ||  || February 12, 1999 || Socorro || LINEAR || FLO || align=right | 3.4 km || 
|-id=322 bgcolor=#E9E9E9
| 28322 Kaeberich ||  ||  || February 12, 1999 || Socorro || LINEAR || — || align=right | 5.9 km || 
|-id=323 bgcolor=#d6d6d6
| 28323 ||  || — || February 12, 1999 || Socorro || LINEAR || EOS || align=right | 3.9 km || 
|-id=324 bgcolor=#fefefe
| 28324 Davidcampeau ||  ||  || February 12, 1999 || Socorro || LINEAR || FLO || align=right | 3.3 km || 
|-id=325 bgcolor=#E9E9E9
| 28325 ||  || — || February 12, 1999 || Socorro || LINEAR || — || align=right | 6.9 km || 
|-id=326 bgcolor=#E9E9E9
| 28326 ||  || — || February 11, 1999 || Socorro || LINEAR || EUN || align=right | 6.3 km || 
|-id=327 bgcolor=#E9E9E9
| 28327 ||  || — || February 11, 1999 || Socorro || LINEAR || — || align=right | 3.6 km || 
|-id=328 bgcolor=#E9E9E9
| 28328 ||  || — || February 11, 1999 || Socorro || LINEAR || ADE || align=right | 9.2 km || 
|-id=329 bgcolor=#fefefe
| 28329 ||  || — || February 13, 1999 || Kitt Peak || Spacewatch || NYS || align=right | 2.8 km || 
|-id=330 bgcolor=#d6d6d6
| 28330 ||  || — || February 12, 1999 || Kitt Peak || Spacewatch || THM || align=right | 6.7 km || 
|-id=331 bgcolor=#d6d6d6
| 28331 Dianebérard ||  ||  || February 14, 1999 || Anderson Mesa || LONEOS || EMA || align=right | 11 km || 
|-id=332 bgcolor=#E9E9E9
| 28332 ||  || — || February 18, 1999 || Haleakala || NEAT || — || align=right | 3.0 km || 
|-id=333 bgcolor=#d6d6d6
| 28333 ||  || — || February 18, 1999 || Haleakala || NEAT || EOS || align=right | 6.3 km || 
|-id=334 bgcolor=#d6d6d6
| 28334 ||  || — || February 19, 1999 || Oizumi || T. Kobayashi || — || align=right | 6.3 km || 
|-id=335 bgcolor=#d6d6d6
| 28335 ||  || — || February 19, 1999 || Oizumi || T. Kobayashi || — || align=right | 13 km || 
|-id=336 bgcolor=#d6d6d6
| 28336 ||  || — || February 17, 1999 || Socorro || LINEAR || — || align=right | 13 km || 
|-id=337 bgcolor=#E9E9E9
| 28337 ||  || — || March 9, 1999 || Kitt Peak || Spacewatch || — || align=right | 2.6 km || 
|-id=338 bgcolor=#d6d6d6
| 28338 ||  || — || March 10, 1999 || Kitt Peak || Spacewatch || — || align=right | 11 km || 
|-id=339 bgcolor=#d6d6d6
| 28339 ||  || — || March 10, 1999 || Reedy Creek || J. Broughton || EOS || align=right | 6.3 km || 
|-id=340 bgcolor=#d6d6d6
| 28340 Yukihiro ||  ||  || March 13, 1999 || Yatsuka || H. Abe || — || align=right | 11 km || 
|-id=341 bgcolor=#d6d6d6
| 28341 Bingaman ||  ||  || March 13, 1999 || Goodricke-Pigott || R. A. Tucker || KOR || align=right | 5.2 km || 
|-id=342 bgcolor=#d6d6d6
| 28342 Haverhals ||  ||  || March 19, 1999 || Anderson Mesa || LONEOS || KOR || align=right | 5.7 km || 
|-id=343 bgcolor=#d6d6d6
| 28343 Florcalandra ||  ||  || March 20, 1999 || Anderson Mesa || LONEOS || TIR || align=right | 9.3 km || 
|-id=344 bgcolor=#E9E9E9
| 28344 Tallsalt ||  ||  || March 22, 1999 || Anderson Mesa || LONEOS || — || align=right | 4.1 km || 
|-id=345 bgcolor=#d6d6d6
| 28345 Akivabarnun ||  ||  || March 22, 1999 || Anderson Mesa || LONEOS || THM || align=right | 11 km || 
|-id=346 bgcolor=#E9E9E9
| 28346 Kent ||  ||  || March 19, 1999 || Fountain Hills || C. W. Juels || — || align=right | 5.8 km || 
|-id=347 bgcolor=#d6d6d6
| 28347 ||  || — || March 19, 1999 || Socorro || LINEAR || EOS || align=right | 7.9 km || 
|-id=348 bgcolor=#d6d6d6
| 28348 ||  || — || March 19, 1999 || Socorro || LINEAR || EOS || align=right | 10 km || 
|-id=349 bgcolor=#E9E9E9
| 28349 ||  || — || March 19, 1999 || Socorro || LINEAR || — || align=right | 5.7 km || 
|-id=350 bgcolor=#d6d6d6
| 28350 ||  || — || March 19, 1999 || Socorro || LINEAR || EOS || align=right | 8.5 km || 
|-id=351 bgcolor=#fefefe
| 28351 Andrewfeldman ||  ||  || March 19, 1999 || Socorro || LINEAR || — || align=right | 2.3 km || 
|-id=352 bgcolor=#d6d6d6
| 28352 ||  || — || March 19, 1999 || Socorro || LINEAR || EOS || align=right | 11 km || 
|-id=353 bgcolor=#fefefe
| 28353 Chrisnielsen ||  ||  || March 19, 1999 || Socorro || LINEAR || FLO || align=right | 3.3 km || 
|-id=354 bgcolor=#d6d6d6
| 28354 ||  || — || March 19, 1999 || Socorro || LINEAR || — || align=right | 11 km || 
|-id=355 bgcolor=#d6d6d6
| 28355 ||  || — || March 19, 1999 || Socorro || LINEAR || — || align=right | 10 km || 
|-id=356 bgcolor=#E9E9E9
| 28356 ||  || — || March 20, 1999 || Socorro || LINEAR || RAF || align=right | 3.3 km || 
|-id=357 bgcolor=#E9E9E9
| 28357 ||  || — || March 20, 1999 || Socorro || LINEAR || MAR || align=right | 4.6 km || 
|-id=358 bgcolor=#d6d6d6
| 28358 ||  || — || March 20, 1999 || Socorro || LINEAR || — || align=right | 10 km || 
|-id=359 bgcolor=#d6d6d6
| 28359 ||  || — || March 20, 1999 || Socorro || LINEAR || — || align=right | 8.0 km || 
|-id=360 bgcolor=#d6d6d6
| 28360 ||  || — || March 20, 1999 || Socorro || LINEAR || — || align=right | 13 km || 
|-id=361 bgcolor=#E9E9E9
| 28361 ||  || — || March 20, 1999 || Socorro || LINEAR || — || align=right | 3.3 km || 
|-id=362 bgcolor=#d6d6d6
| 28362 ||  || — || April 7, 1999 || Nachi-Katsuura || Y. Shimizu, T. Urata || NAE || align=right | 12 km || 
|-id=363 bgcolor=#d6d6d6
| 28363 ||  || — || April 14, 1999 || Woomera || F. B. Zoltowski || KOR || align=right | 3.7 km || 
|-id=364 bgcolor=#d6d6d6
| 28364 Bruceelmegreen ||  ||  || April 7, 1999 || Anderson Mesa || LONEOS || — || align=right | 4.8 km || 
|-id=365 bgcolor=#E9E9E9
| 28365 ||  || — || April 15, 1999 || Socorro || LINEAR || — || align=right | 8.7 km || 
|-id=366 bgcolor=#E9E9E9
| 28366 Verkuil ||  ||  || April 9, 1999 || Socorro || LINEAR || — || align=right | 7.2 km || 
|-id=367 bgcolor=#d6d6d6
| 28367 ||  || — || April 15, 1999 || Socorro || LINEAR || — || align=right | 9.8 km || 
|-id=368 bgcolor=#d6d6d6
| 28368 ||  || — || April 15, 1999 || Socorro || LINEAR || — || align=right | 11 km || 
|-id=369 bgcolor=#d6d6d6
| 28369 ||  || — || April 15, 1999 || Socorro || LINEAR || — || align=right | 12 km || 
|-id=370 bgcolor=#d6d6d6
| 28370 ||  || — || April 6, 1999 || Socorro || LINEAR || — || align=right | 7.6 km || 
|-id=371 bgcolor=#d6d6d6
| 28371 ||  || — || April 12, 1999 || Socorro || LINEAR || EOS || align=right | 9.9 km || 
|-id=372 bgcolor=#d6d6d6
| 28372 || 1999 HU || — || April 18, 1999 || Woomera || F. B. Zoltowski || EOS || align=right | 9.9 km || 
|-id=373 bgcolor=#d6d6d6
| 28373 ||  || — || April 18, 1999 || Catalina || CSS || — || align=right | 17 km || 
|-id=374 bgcolor=#d6d6d6
| 28374 ||  || — || April 17, 1999 || Socorro || LINEAR || THM || align=right | 9.4 km || 
|-id=375 bgcolor=#d6d6d6
| 28375 || 1999 JC || — || May 2, 1999 || Višnjan Observatory || K. Korlević || THM || align=right | 12 km || 
|-id=376 bgcolor=#fefefe
| 28376 Atifjaved ||  ||  || May 10, 1999 || Socorro || LINEAR || FLO || align=right | 1.9 km || 
|-id=377 bgcolor=#E9E9E9
| 28377 ||  || — || May 10, 1999 || Socorro || LINEAR || EUN || align=right | 7.4 km || 
|-id=378 bgcolor=#d6d6d6
| 28378 ||  || — || May 10, 1999 || Socorro || LINEAR || EOS || align=right | 8.8 km || 
|-id=379 bgcolor=#fefefe
| 28379 ||  || — || May 10, 1999 || Socorro || LINEAR || — || align=right | 3.2 km || 
|-id=380 bgcolor=#E9E9E9
| 28380 ||  || — || May 10, 1999 || Socorro || LINEAR || GEF || align=right | 6.2 km || 
|-id=381 bgcolor=#d6d6d6
| 28381 ||  || — || May 10, 1999 || Socorro || LINEAR || EOS || align=right | 10 km || 
|-id=382 bgcolor=#fefefe
| 28382 Stevengillen ||  ||  || May 10, 1999 || Socorro || LINEAR || MAS || align=right | 2.4 km || 
|-id=383 bgcolor=#E9E9E9
| 28383 ||  || — || May 12, 1999 || Socorro || LINEAR || — || align=right | 5.9 km || 
|-id=384 bgcolor=#fefefe
| 28384 ||  || — || May 10, 1999 || Socorro || LINEAR || V || align=right | 4.4 km || 
|-id=385 bgcolor=#d6d6d6
| 28385 ||  || — || May 12, 1999 || Socorro || LINEAR || — || align=right | 19 km || 
|-id=386 bgcolor=#d6d6d6
| 28386 ||  || — || May 13, 1999 || Socorro || LINEAR || — || align=right | 8.3 km || 
|-id=387 bgcolor=#d6d6d6
| 28387 ||  || — || May 13, 1999 || Socorro || LINEAR || MEL || align=right | 14 km || 
|-id=388 bgcolor=#d6d6d6
| 28388 ||  || — || May 12, 1999 || Socorro || LINEAR || — || align=right | 8.5 km || 
|-id=389 bgcolor=#d6d6d6
| 28389 ||  || — || May 12, 1999 || Socorro || LINEAR || — || align=right | 11 km || 
|-id=390 bgcolor=#fefefe
| 28390 Demjohopkins ||  ||  || May 13, 1999 || Socorro || LINEAR || FLO || align=right | 2.4 km || 
|-id=391 bgcolor=#d6d6d6
| 28391 ||  || — || June 9, 1999 || Socorro || LINEAR || — || align=right | 14 km || 
|-id=392 bgcolor=#E9E9E9
| 28392 ||  || — || July 13, 1999 || Socorro || LINEAR || — || align=right | 4.5 km || 
|-id=393 bgcolor=#d6d6d6
| 28393 ||  || — || September 7, 1999 || Socorro || LINEAR || — || align=right | 8.4 km || 
|-id=394 bgcolor=#E9E9E9
| 28394 Mittag-Leffler ||  ||  || September 13, 1999 || Prescott || P. G. Comba || — || align=right | 4.8 km || 
|-id=395 bgcolor=#E9E9E9
| 28395 ||  || — || September 3, 1999 || Siding Spring || R. H. McNaught || — || align=right | 7.1 km || 
|-id=396 bgcolor=#fefefe
| 28396 Eymann ||  ||  || September 13, 1999 || Guitalens || A. Klotz || V || align=right | 1.9 km || 
|-id=397 bgcolor=#fefefe
| 28397 Forrestbetton ||  ||  || September 7, 1999 || Socorro || LINEAR || V || align=right | 2.0 km || 
|-id=398 bgcolor=#E9E9E9
| 28398 Ericthomas ||  ||  || September 7, 1999 || Socorro || LINEAR || — || align=right | 2.7 km || 
|-id=399 bgcolor=#d6d6d6
| 28399 ||  || — || September 9, 1999 || Socorro || LINEAR || EOS || align=right | 5.3 km || 
|-id=400 bgcolor=#d6d6d6
| 28400 Morgansinko ||  ||  || September 9, 1999 || Socorro || LINEAR || — || align=right | 5.1 km || 
|}

28401–28500 

|-bgcolor=#d6d6d6
| 28401 ||  || — || September 9, 1999 || Socorro || LINEAR || — || align=right | 11 km || 
|-id=402 bgcolor=#fefefe
| 28402 Matthewkim ||  ||  || September 8, 1999 || Socorro || LINEAR || V || align=right | 2.2 km || 
|-id=403 bgcolor=#E9E9E9
| 28403 || 1999 TY || — || October 1, 1999 || Višnjan Observatory || K. Korlević || GER || align=right | 5.7 km || 
|-id=404 bgcolor=#E9E9E9
| 28404 ||  || — || October 1, 1999 || Višnjan Observatory || K. Korlević, M. Jurić || — || align=right | 6.2 km || 
|-id=405 bgcolor=#fefefe
| 28405 ||  || — || October 10, 1999 || Oohira || T. Urata || FLO || align=right | 2.6 km || 
|-id=406 bgcolor=#d6d6d6
| 28406 ||  || — || October 2, 1999 || Socorro || LINEAR || FIR || align=right | 11 km || 
|-id=407 bgcolor=#E9E9E9
| 28407 Meghanarao ||  ||  || October 6, 1999 || Socorro || LINEAR || — || align=right | 6.8 km || 
|-id=408 bgcolor=#E9E9E9
| 28408 van Baalen ||  ||  || October 2, 1999 || Anderson Mesa || LONEOS || — || align=right | 5.3 km || 
|-id=409 bgcolor=#E9E9E9
| 28409 ||  || — || October 3, 1999 || Kitt Peak || Spacewatch || — || align=right | 5.3 km || 
|-id=410 bgcolor=#d6d6d6
| 28410 ||  || — || October 8, 1999 || Catalina || CSS || — || align=right | 9.1 km || 
|-id=411 bgcolor=#fefefe
| 28411 Xiuqicao ||  ||  || October 9, 1999 || Socorro || LINEAR || V || align=right | 1.4 km || 
|-id=412 bgcolor=#fefefe
| 28412 ||  || — || October 29, 1999 || Catalina || CSS || — || align=right | 3.7 km || 
|-id=413 bgcolor=#E9E9E9
| 28413 ||  || — || October 30, 1999 || Catalina || CSS || — || align=right | 3.0 km || 
|-id=414 bgcolor=#E9E9E9
| 28414 ||  || — || October 31, 1999 || Catalina || CSS || — || align=right | 3.3 km || 
|-id=415 bgcolor=#E9E9E9
| 28415 Yingxiong ||  ||  || November 3, 1999 || Socorro || LINEAR || — || align=right | 3.7 km || 
|-id=416 bgcolor=#fefefe
| 28416 Ngqin ||  ||  || November 3, 1999 || Socorro || LINEAR || — || align=right | 1.8 km || 
|-id=417 bgcolor=#fefefe
| 28417 Leewei ||  ||  || November 3, 1999 || Socorro || LINEAR || — || align=right | 6.6 km || 
|-id=418 bgcolor=#fefefe
| 28418 Pornwasu ||  ||  || November 4, 1999 || Socorro || LINEAR || — || align=right | 1.6 km || 
|-id=419 bgcolor=#fefefe
| 28419 Tanpitcha ||  ||  || November 4, 1999 || Socorro || LINEAR || FLO || align=right | 2.0 km || 
|-id=420 bgcolor=#d6d6d6
| 28420 ||  || — || November 4, 1999 || Socorro || LINEAR || — || align=right | 4.3 km || 
|-id=421 bgcolor=#fefefe
| 28421 ||  || — || November 6, 1999 || Catalina || CSS || H || align=right | 2.0 km || 
|-id=422 bgcolor=#E9E9E9
| 28422 ||  || — || November 13, 1999 || Catalina || CSS || GEF || align=right | 3.9 km || 
|-id=423 bgcolor=#d6d6d6
| 28423 ||  || — || November 28, 1999 || Oizumi || T. Kobayashi || — || align=right | 8.6 km || 
|-id=424 bgcolor=#fefefe
| 28424 || 1999 XA || — || December 1, 1999 || Socorro || LINEAR || CHL || align=right | 6.5 km || 
|-id=425 bgcolor=#E9E9E9
| 28425 Sungkanit ||  ||  || December 6, 1999 || Socorro || LINEAR || — || align=right | 4.0 km || 
|-id=426 bgcolor=#E9E9E9
| 28426 Sangani ||  ||  || December 6, 1999 || Socorro || LINEAR || HEN || align=right | 3.0 km || 
|-id=427 bgcolor=#E9E9E9
| 28427 Gidwani ||  ||  || December 7, 1999 || Socorro || LINEAR || — || align=right | 2.5 km || 
|-id=428 bgcolor=#fefefe
| 28428 Ankurvaishnav ||  ||  || December 7, 1999 || Socorro || LINEAR || — || align=right | 2.5 km || 
|-id=429 bgcolor=#fefefe
| 28429 ||  || — || December 7, 1999 || Socorro || LINEAR || — || align=right | 2.3 km || 
|-id=430 bgcolor=#fefefe
| 28430 ||  || — || December 7, 1999 || Catalina || CSS || V || align=right | 1.8 km || 
|-id=431 bgcolor=#fefefe
| 28431 ||  || — || December 13, 1999 || Fountain Hills || C. W. Juels || — || align=right | 2.0 km || 
|-id=432 bgcolor=#E9E9E9
| 28432 ||  || — || December 10, 1999 || Socorro || LINEAR || EUN || align=right | 5.6 km || 
|-id=433 bgcolor=#E9E9E9
| 28433 Samarquez ||  ||  || December 10, 1999 || Socorro || LINEAR || — || align=right | 3.6 km || 
|-id=434 bgcolor=#fefefe
| 28434 ||  || — || December 10, 1999 || Socorro || LINEAR || — || align=right | 8.2 km || 
|-id=435 bgcolor=#d6d6d6
| 28435 ||  || — || December 13, 1999 || Socorro || LINEAR || — || align=right | 5.4 km || 
|-id=436 bgcolor=#fefefe
| 28436 Davesawyer ||  ||  || December 7, 1999 || Anderson Mesa || LONEOS || — || align=right | 2.2 km || 
|-id=437 bgcolor=#fefefe
| 28437 ||  || — || December 31, 1999 || Kitt Peak || Spacewatch || — || align=right | 3.1 km || 
|-id=438 bgcolor=#fefefe
| 28438 Venkateswaran ||  ||  || January 3, 2000 || Socorro || LINEAR || NYS || align=right | 1.8 km || 
|-id=439 bgcolor=#E9E9E9
| 28439 Miguelreyes ||  ||  || January 3, 2000 || Socorro || LINEAR || — || align=right | 3.9 km || 
|-id=440 bgcolor=#fefefe
| 28440 ||  || — || January 3, 2000 || Socorro || LINEAR || — || align=right | 2.2 km || 
|-id=441 bgcolor=#fefefe
| 28441 ||  || — || January 5, 2000 || Socorro || LINEAR || H || align=right | 1.4 km || 
|-id=442 bgcolor=#fefefe
| 28442 Nicholashuey ||  ||  || January 4, 2000 || Socorro || LINEAR || NYS || align=right | 2.2 km || 
|-id=443 bgcolor=#fefefe
| 28443 Crisara ||  ||  || January 5, 2000 || Socorro || LINEAR || — || align=right | 1.8 km || 
|-id=444 bgcolor=#fefefe
| 28444 Alexrabii ||  ||  || January 5, 2000 || Socorro || LINEAR || FLO || align=right | 2.3 km || 
|-id=445 bgcolor=#E9E9E9
| 28445 ||  || — || January 4, 2000 || Socorro || LINEAR || — || align=right | 4.8 km || 
|-id=446 bgcolor=#fefefe
| 28446 Davlantes ||  ||  || January 4, 2000 || Socorro || LINEAR || — || align=right | 2.3 km || 
|-id=447 bgcolor=#fefefe
| 28447 Arjunmathur ||  ||  || January 4, 2000 || Socorro || LINEAR || — || align=right | 2.1 km || 
|-id=448 bgcolor=#fefefe
| 28448 ||  || — || January 4, 2000 || Socorro || LINEAR || — || align=right | 6.2 km || 
|-id=449 bgcolor=#E9E9E9
| 28449 Ericlau ||  ||  || January 5, 2000 || Socorro || LINEAR || — || align=right | 4.9 km || 
|-id=450 bgcolor=#fefefe
| 28450 Saravolz ||  ||  || January 5, 2000 || Socorro || LINEAR || FLO || align=right | 2.4 km || 
|-id=451 bgcolor=#fefefe
| 28451 Tylerhoward ||  ||  || January 5, 2000 || Socorro || LINEAR || NYS || align=right | 2.0 km || 
|-id=452 bgcolor=#fefefe
| 28452 Natkondamuri ||  ||  || January 5, 2000 || Socorro || LINEAR || — || align=right | 5.4 km || 
|-id=453 bgcolor=#E9E9E9
| 28453 Alexcecil ||  ||  || January 6, 2000 || Socorro || LINEAR || — || align=right | 4.3 km || 
|-id=454 bgcolor=#E9E9E9
| 28454 ||  || — || January 4, 2000 || Socorro || LINEAR || — || align=right | 8.9 km || 
|-id=455 bgcolor=#E9E9E9
| 28455 ||  || — || January 4, 2000 || Socorro || LINEAR || — || align=right | 5.4 km || 
|-id=456 bgcolor=#E9E9E9
| 28456 ||  || — || January 4, 2000 || Socorro || LINEAR || — || align=right | 5.0 km || 
|-id=457 bgcolor=#fefefe
| 28457 Chloeanassis ||  ||  || January 5, 2000 || Socorro || LINEAR || V || align=right | 2.7 km || 
|-id=458 bgcolor=#E9E9E9
| 28458 ||  || — || January 5, 2000 || Socorro || LINEAR || — || align=right | 5.5 km || 
|-id=459 bgcolor=#d6d6d6
| 28459 ||  || — || January 5, 2000 || Socorro || LINEAR || 2:1J || align=right | 7.4 km || 
|-id=460 bgcolor=#E9E9E9
| 28460 Ariannepapa ||  ||  || January 5, 2000 || Socorro || LINEAR || — || align=right | 6.7 km || 
|-id=461 bgcolor=#fefefe
| 28461 ||  || — || January 5, 2000 || Socorro || LINEAR || — || align=right | 5.6 km || 
|-id=462 bgcolor=#fefefe
| 28462 ||  || — || January 5, 2000 || Socorro || LINEAR || — || align=right | 3.7 km || 
|-id=463 bgcolor=#fefefe
| 28463 ||  || — || January 7, 2000 || Farpoint || Farpoint Obs. || V || align=right | 1.9 km || 
|-id=464 bgcolor=#E9E9E9
| 28464 ||  || — || January 8, 2000 || Socorro || LINEAR || — || align=right | 3.4 km || 
|-id=465 bgcolor=#fefefe
| 28465 Janesmyth ||  ||  || January 5, 2000 || Socorro || LINEAR || NYS || align=right | 3.3 km || 
|-id=466 bgcolor=#E9E9E9
| 28466 ||  || — || January 7, 2000 || Socorro || LINEAR || MIT || align=right | 7.8 km || 
|-id=467 bgcolor=#fefefe
| 28467 Maurentejamie ||  ||  || January 7, 2000 || Socorro || LINEAR || — || align=right | 2.4 km || 
|-id=468 bgcolor=#E9E9E9
| 28468 Shichangxu ||  ||  || January 12, 2000 || Xinglong || SCAP || — || align=right | 4.6 km || 
|-id=469 bgcolor=#d6d6d6
| 28469 ||  || — || January 29, 2000 || Socorro || LINEAR || — || align=right | 8.3 km || 
|-id=470 bgcolor=#fefefe
| 28470 ||  || — || January 28, 2000 || Kitt Peak || Spacewatch || — || align=right | 3.3 km || 
|-id=471 bgcolor=#fefefe
| 28471 ||  || — || January 27, 2000 || Oizumi || T. Kobayashi || NYS || align=right | 2.3 km || 
|-id=472 bgcolor=#E9E9E9
| 28472 ||  || — || January 28, 2000 || Oizumi || T. Kobayashi || EUN || align=right | 4.6 km || 
|-id=473 bgcolor=#d6d6d6
| 28473 ||  || — || January 31, 2000 || Oizumi || T. Kobayashi || EOS || align=right | 6.4 km || 
|-id=474 bgcolor=#fefefe
| 28474 Bustamante ||  ||  || January 30, 2000 || Socorro || LINEAR || FLO || align=right | 3.0 km || 
|-id=475 bgcolor=#fefefe
| 28475 Garrett || 2000 CU ||  || February 1, 2000 || Catalina || CSS || — || align=right | 2.3 km || 
|-id=476 bgcolor=#fefefe
| 28476 ||  || — || February 2, 2000 || Oizumi || T. Kobayashi || FLO || align=right | 2.9 km || 
|-id=477 bgcolor=#d6d6d6
| 28477 ||  || — || February 5, 2000 || Socorro || LINEAR || BRA || align=right | 5.1 km || 
|-id=478 bgcolor=#fefefe
| 28478 ||  || — || February 2, 2000 || Socorro || LINEAR || — || align=right | 2.3 km || 
|-id=479 bgcolor=#fefefe
| 28479 Varlotta ||  ||  || February 2, 2000 || Socorro || LINEAR || FLO || align=right | 2.5 km || 
|-id=480 bgcolor=#fefefe
| 28480 Seojinyoung ||  ||  || February 2, 2000 || Socorro || LINEAR || NYS || align=right | 3.2 km || 
|-id=481 bgcolor=#fefefe
| 28481 Shindongju ||  ||  || February 2, 2000 || Socorro || LINEAR || MAS || align=right | 2.1 km || 
|-id=482 bgcolor=#E9E9E9
| 28482 Bauerle ||  ||  || February 2, 2000 || Socorro || LINEAR || — || align=right | 5.5 km || 
|-id=483 bgcolor=#fefefe
| 28483 Allenyuan ||  ||  || February 4, 2000 || Socorro || LINEAR || — || align=right | 2.4 km || 
|-id=484 bgcolor=#fefefe
| 28484 Aishwarya ||  ||  || February 2, 2000 || Socorro || LINEAR || FLO || align=right | 2.0 km || 
|-id=485 bgcolor=#fefefe
| 28485 Dastidar ||  ||  || February 2, 2000 || Socorro || LINEAR || — || align=right | 3.1 km || 
|-id=486 bgcolor=#fefefe
| 28486 ||  || — || February 2, 2000 || Socorro || LINEAR || — || align=right | 2.7 km || 
|-id=487 bgcolor=#E9E9E9
| 28487 ||  || — || February 5, 2000 || Socorro || LINEAR || — || align=right | 3.2 km || 
|-id=488 bgcolor=#fefefe
| 28488 Gautam ||  ||  || February 5, 2000 || Socorro || LINEAR || — || align=right | 5.0 km || 
|-id=489 bgcolor=#d6d6d6
| 28489 ||  || — || February 5, 2000 || Socorro || LINEAR || ALA || align=right | 17 km || 
|-id=490 bgcolor=#d6d6d6
| 28490 ||  || — || February 5, 2000 || Socorro || LINEAR || — || align=right | 15 km || 
|-id=491 bgcolor=#E9E9E9
| 28491 ||  || — || February 5, 2000 || Farpoint || Farpoint Obs. || — || align=right | 8.5 km || 
|-id=492 bgcolor=#fefefe
| 28492 Marik ||  ||  || February 1, 2000 || Piszkéstető || JATE Asteroid Survey || — || align=right | 3.0 km || 
|-id=493 bgcolor=#fefefe
| 28493 Duncan-Lewis ||  ||  || February 2, 2000 || Socorro || LINEAR || — || align=right | 2.0 km || 
|-id=494 bgcolor=#fefefe
| 28494 Jasmine ||  ||  || February 2, 2000 || Socorro || LINEAR || FLO || align=right | 2.3 km || 
|-id=495 bgcolor=#fefefe
| 28495 ||  || — || February 2, 2000 || Socorro || LINEAR || — || align=right | 3.6 km || 
|-id=496 bgcolor=#d6d6d6
| 28496 ||  || — || February 1, 2000 || Kitt Peak || Spacewatch || HYG || align=right | 5.6 km || 
|-id=497 bgcolor=#fefefe
| 28497 ||  || — || February 1, 2000 || Kitt Peak || Spacewatch || EUTslow || align=right | 1.9 km || 
|-id=498 bgcolor=#fefefe
| 28498 ||  || — || February 7, 2000 || Socorro || LINEAR || — || align=right | 6.3 km || 
|-id=499 bgcolor=#fefefe
| 28499 ||  || — || February 4, 2000 || Socorro || LINEAR || — || align=right | 2.8 km || 
|-id=500 bgcolor=#fefefe
| 28500 ||  || — || February 10, 2000 || Višnjan Observatory || K. Korlević || V || align=right | 1.8 km || 
|}

28501–28600 

|-bgcolor=#fefefe
| 28501 ||  || — || February 8, 2000 || Kitt Peak || Spacewatch || MAS || align=right | 1.2 km || 
|-id=502 bgcolor=#E9E9E9
| 28502 ||  || — || February 8, 2000 || Kitt Peak || Spacewatch || ADE || align=right | 9.3 km || 
|-id=503 bgcolor=#fefefe
| 28503 Angelazhang ||  ||  || February 4, 2000 || Socorro || LINEAR || NYS || align=right | 2.7 km || 
|-id=504 bgcolor=#fefefe
| 28504 Rebeccafaye ||  ||  || February 4, 2000 || Socorro || LINEAR || V || align=right | 2.1 km || 
|-id=505 bgcolor=#fefefe
| 28505 Sagarrambhia ||  ||  || February 4, 2000 || Socorro || LINEAR || FLO || align=right | 2.0 km || 
|-id=506 bgcolor=#fefefe
| 28506 ||  || — || February 4, 2000 || Socorro || LINEAR || — || align=right | 2.7 km || 
|-id=507 bgcolor=#fefefe
| 28507 ||  || — || February 4, 2000 || Socorro || LINEAR || — || align=right | 2.6 km || 
|-id=508 bgcolor=#fefefe
| 28508 Kishore ||  ||  || February 4, 2000 || Socorro || LINEAR || — || align=right | 3.2 km || 
|-id=509 bgcolor=#fefefe
| 28509 Feddersen ||  ||  || February 6, 2000 || Socorro || LINEAR || — || align=right | 2.4 km || 
|-id=510 bgcolor=#E9E9E9
| 28510 ||  || — || February 8, 2000 || Socorro || LINEAR || MAR || align=right | 4.8 km || 
|-id=511 bgcolor=#fefefe
| 28511 Marggraff ||  ||  || February 2, 2000 || Socorro || LINEAR || NYS || align=right | 2.2 km || 
|-id=512 bgcolor=#E9E9E9
| 28512 Tanyuan ||  ||  || February 6, 2000 || Socorro || LINEAR || — || align=right | 6.6 km || 
|-id=513 bgcolor=#fefefe
| 28513 Guo ||  ||  || February 5, 2000 || Kitt Peak || M. W. Buie || NYS || align=right | 1.4 km || 
|-id=514 bgcolor=#fefefe
| 28514 ||  || — || February 26, 2000 || Oaxaca || J. M. Roe || — || align=right | 5.6 km || 
|-id=515 bgcolor=#E9E9E9
| 28515 ||  || — || February 27, 2000 || Višnjan Observatory || K. Korlević, M. Jurić || — || align=right | 3.5 km || 
|-id=516 bgcolor=#E9E9E9
| 28516 Möbius ||  ||  || February 27, 2000 || Prescott || P. G. Comba || — || align=right | 3.3 km || 
|-id=517 bgcolor=#fefefe
| 28517 ||  || — || February 29, 2000 || Oizumi || T. Kobayashi || — || align=right | 3.1 km || 
|-id=518 bgcolor=#fefefe
| 28518 ||  || — || February 29, 2000 || Oizumi || T. Kobayashi || V || align=right | 3.8 km || 
|-id=519 bgcolor=#fefefe
| 28519 Sweetman ||  ||  || February 26, 2000 || Catalina || CSS || FLO || align=right | 3.4 km || 
|-id=520 bgcolor=#fefefe
| 28520 ||  || — || February 29, 2000 || Višnjan Observatory || K. Korlević || FLO || align=right | 3.0 km || 
|-id=521 bgcolor=#fefefe
| 28521 Mattmcintyre ||  ||  || February 29, 2000 || Socorro || LINEAR || — || align=right | 3.2 km || 
|-id=522 bgcolor=#fefefe
| 28522 ||  || — || February 29, 2000 || Socorro || LINEAR || — || align=right | 1.8 km || 
|-id=523 bgcolor=#d6d6d6
| 28523 ||  || — || February 29, 2000 || Socorro || LINEAR || THM || align=right | 8.5 km || 
|-id=524 bgcolor=#fefefe
| 28524 Ebright ||  ||  || February 29, 2000 || Socorro || LINEAR || — || align=right | 2.4 km || 
|-id=525 bgcolor=#fefefe
| 28525 Andrewabboud ||  ||  || February 29, 2000 || Socorro || LINEAR || FLO || align=right | 2.2 km || 
|-id=526 bgcolor=#fefefe
| 28526 ||  || — || February 29, 2000 || Socorro || LINEAR || — || align=right | 1.5 km || 
|-id=527 bgcolor=#fefefe
| 28527 Kathleenrose ||  ||  || February 29, 2000 || Socorro || LINEAR || — || align=right | 2.3 km || 
|-id=528 bgcolor=#fefefe
| 28528 ||  || — || February 29, 2000 || Socorro || LINEAR || — || align=right | 3.2 km || 
|-id=529 bgcolor=#E9E9E9
| 28529 ||  || — || February 29, 2000 || Socorro || LINEAR || — || align=right | 6.1 km || 
|-id=530 bgcolor=#E9E9E9
| 28530 Shiyimeng ||  ||  || February 29, 2000 || Socorro || LINEAR || — || align=right | 4.4 km || 
|-id=531 bgcolor=#fefefe
| 28531 Nikbogdanov ||  ||  || February 29, 2000 || Socorro || LINEAR || — || align=right | 4.6 km || 
|-id=532 bgcolor=#fefefe
| 28532 ||  || — || February 29, 2000 || Socorro || LINEAR || — || align=right | 3.1 km || 
|-id=533 bgcolor=#fefefe
| 28533 Iansohl ||  ||  || February 29, 2000 || Socorro || LINEAR || NYS || align=right | 1.9 km || 
|-id=534 bgcolor=#fefefe
| 28534 Taylorwilson ||  ||  || February 28, 2000 || Socorro || LINEAR || V || align=right | 1.9 km || 
|-id=535 bgcolor=#fefefe
| 28535 Sungjanet ||  ||  || February 29, 2000 || Socorro || LINEAR || — || align=right | 2.3 km || 
|-id=536 bgcolor=#E9E9E9
| 28536 Hunaiwen ||  ||  || February 29, 2000 || Socorro || LINEAR || — || align=right | 3.0 km || 
|-id=537 bgcolor=#E9E9E9
| 28537 Kirapowell ||  ||  || February 29, 2000 || Socorro || LINEAR || — || align=right | 2.8 km || 
|-id=538 bgcolor=#fefefe
| 28538 Ruisong ||  ||  || February 29, 2000 || Socorro || LINEAR || V || align=right | 2.1 km || 
|-id=539 bgcolor=#E9E9E9
| 28539 ||  || — || March 3, 2000 || Socorro || LINEAR || — || align=right | 3.5 km || 
|-id=540 bgcolor=#d6d6d6
| 28540 ||  || — || March 4, 2000 || Reedy Creek || J. Broughton || — || align=right | 6.2 km || 
|-id=541 bgcolor=#fefefe
| 28541 ||  || — || March 2, 2000 || Kitt Peak || Spacewatch || — || align=right | 2.8 km || 
|-id=542 bgcolor=#E9E9E9
| 28542 Cespedes-Nano ||  ||  || March 3, 2000 || Socorro || LINEAR || — || align=right | 3.1 km || 
|-id=543 bgcolor=#fefefe
| 28543 Solis-Gozar ||  ||  || March 3, 2000 || Socorro || LINEAR || V || align=right | 2.1 km || 
|-id=544 bgcolor=#fefefe
| 28544 ||  || — || March 5, 2000 || Socorro || LINEAR || — || align=right | 1.8 km || 
|-id=545 bgcolor=#fefefe
| 28545 ||  || — || March 7, 2000 || Višnjan Observatory || K. Korlević || PHO || align=right | 2.7 km || 
|-id=546 bgcolor=#d6d6d6
| 28546 ||  || — || March 7, 2000 || Višnjan Observatory || K. Korlević || VER || align=right | 17 km || 
|-id=547 bgcolor=#fefefe
| 28547 Johannschröter ||  ||  || March 3, 2000 || Catalina || CSS || — || align=right | 2.0 km || 
|-id=548 bgcolor=#fefefe
| 28548 ||  || — || March 8, 2000 || Kitt Peak || Spacewatch || — || align=right | 2.2 km || 
|-id=549 bgcolor=#fefefe
| 28549 ||  || — || March 8, 2000 || Kitt Peak || Spacewatch || — || align=right | 3.4 km || 
|-id=550 bgcolor=#fefefe
| 28550 ||  || — || March 8, 2000 || Kitt Peak || Spacewatch || V || align=right | 3.3 km || 
|-id=551 bgcolor=#fefefe
| 28551 Paulomi ||  ||  || March 8, 2000 || Socorro || LINEAR || NYS || align=right | 2.6 km || 
|-id=552 bgcolor=#E9E9E9
| 28552 ||  || — || March 8, 2000 || Socorro || LINEAR || RAFslow || align=right | 8.5 km || 
|-id=553 bgcolor=#fefefe
| 28553 Bhupatiraju ||  ||  || March 8, 2000 || Socorro || LINEAR || — || align=right | 1.9 km || 
|-id=554 bgcolor=#E9E9E9
| 28554 Adambowman ||  ||  || March 8, 2000 || Socorro || LINEAR || — || align=right | 3.1 km || 
|-id=555 bgcolor=#fefefe
| 28555 Jenniferchan ||  ||  || March 8, 2000 || Socorro || LINEAR || — || align=right | 2.2 km || 
|-id=556 bgcolor=#E9E9E9
| 28556 Kevinchen ||  ||  || March 8, 2000 || Socorro || LINEAR || — || align=right | 4.1 km || 
|-id=557 bgcolor=#fefefe
| 28557 Lillianchin ||  ||  || March 8, 2000 || Socorro || LINEAR || — || align=right | 2.9 km || 
|-id=558 bgcolor=#fefefe
| 28558 Kathcordwell ||  ||  || March 9, 2000 || Socorro || LINEAR || — || align=right | 3.3 km || 
|-id=559 bgcolor=#fefefe
| 28559 Anniedai ||  ||  || March 9, 2000 || Socorro || LINEAR || V || align=right | 2.9 km || 
|-id=560 bgcolor=#E9E9E9
| 28560 ||  || — || March 9, 2000 || Socorro || LINEAR || — || align=right | 4.6 km || 
|-id=561 bgcolor=#d6d6d6
| 28561 ||  || — || March 9, 2000 || Socorro || LINEAR || THM || align=right | 8.6 km || 
|-id=562 bgcolor=#fefefe
| 28562 ||  || — || March 9, 2000 || Socorro || LINEAR || — || align=right | 5.8 km || 
|-id=563 bgcolor=#fefefe
| 28563 Dantzler ||  ||  || March 8, 2000 || Socorro || LINEAR || — || align=right | 2.1 km || 
|-id=564 bgcolor=#fefefe
| 28564 Gunderman ||  ||  || March 8, 2000 || Socorro || LINEAR || FLO || align=right | 2.9 km || 
|-id=565 bgcolor=#FA8072
| 28565 ||  || — || March 8, 2000 || Socorro || LINEAR || — || align=right | 2.9 km || 
|-id=566 bgcolor=#fefefe
| 28566 ||  || — || March 10, 2000 || Socorro || LINEAR || — || align=right | 1.7 km || 
|-id=567 bgcolor=#E9E9E9
| 28567 ||  || — || March 10, 2000 || Socorro || LINEAR || — || align=right | 3.0 km || 
|-id=568 bgcolor=#E9E9E9
| 28568 Jacobjohnson ||  ||  || March 10, 2000 || Socorro || LINEAR || — || align=right | 2.2 km || 
|-id=569 bgcolor=#fefefe
| 28569 Kallenbach ||  ||  || March 10, 2000 || Socorro || LINEAR || — || align=right | 2.0 km || 
|-id=570 bgcolor=#fefefe
| 28570 Peterkraft ||  ||  || March 5, 2000 || Socorro || LINEAR || FLO || align=right | 2.0 km || 
|-id=571 bgcolor=#fefefe
| 28571 Hannahlarson ||  ||  || March 5, 2000 || Socorro || LINEAR || V || align=right | 1.8 km || 
|-id=572 bgcolor=#fefefe
| 28572 Salebreton ||  ||  || March 5, 2000 || Socorro || LINEAR || — || align=right | 3.1 km || 
|-id=573 bgcolor=#E9E9E9
| 28573 ||  || — || March 5, 2000 || Socorro || LINEAR || — || align=right | 3.3 km || 
|-id=574 bgcolor=#fefefe
| 28574 ||  || — || March 9, 2000 || Socorro || LINEAR || — || align=right | 2.6 km || 
|-id=575 bgcolor=#fefefe
| 28575 McQuaid ||  ||  || March 10, 2000 || Socorro || LINEAR || NYS || align=right | 4.5 km || 
|-id=576 bgcolor=#fefefe
| 28576 ||  || — || March 12, 2000 || Socorro || LINEAR || — || align=right | 6.2 km || 
|-id=577 bgcolor=#E9E9E9
| 28577 ||  || — || March 10, 2000 || Socorro || LINEAR || — || align=right | 7.3 km || 
|-id=578 bgcolor=#fefefe
| 28578 ||  || — || March 10, 2000 || Socorro || LINEAR || V || align=right | 2.9 km || 
|-id=579 bgcolor=#fefefe
| 28579 ||  || — || March 10, 2000 || Socorro || LINEAR || — || align=right | 3.7 km || 
|-id=580 bgcolor=#fefefe
| 28580 ||  || — || March 14, 2000 || Višnjan Observatory || K. Korlević || V || align=right | 2.1 km || 
|-id=581 bgcolor=#fefefe
| 28581 Dyerlytle ||  ||  || March 11, 2000 || Anderson Mesa || LONEOS || — || align=right | 2.3 km || 
|-id=582 bgcolor=#E9E9E9
| 28582 Haileyosborn ||  ||  || March 11, 2000 || Anderson Mesa || LONEOS || — || align=right | 4.4 km || 
|-id=583 bgcolor=#E9E9E9
| 28583 Mehrotra ||  ||  || March 8, 2000 || Socorro || LINEAR || — || align=right | 2.7 km || 
|-id=584 bgcolor=#fefefe
| 28584 ||  || — || March 8, 2000 || Haleakala || NEAT || NYS || align=right | 2.0 km || 
|-id=585 bgcolor=#fefefe
| 28585 ||  || — || March 8, 2000 || Haleakala || NEAT || FLO || align=right | 2.6 km || 
|-id=586 bgcolor=#d6d6d6
| 28586 ||  || — || March 9, 2000 || Socorro || LINEAR || THM || align=right | 8.0 km || 
|-id=587 bgcolor=#fefefe
| 28587 Mundkur ||  ||  || March 9, 2000 || Socorro || LINEAR || V || align=right | 2.7 km || 
|-id=588 bgcolor=#d6d6d6
| 28588 ||  || — || March 9, 2000 || Socorro || LINEAR || — || align=right | 10 km || 
|-id=589 bgcolor=#fefefe
| 28589 Nisley ||  ||  || March 11, 2000 || Anderson Mesa || LONEOS || — || align=right | 2.1 km || 
|-id=590 bgcolor=#fefefe
| 28590 Kyledilger ||  ||  || March 11, 2000 || Anderson Mesa || LONEOS || — || align=right | 2.6 km || 
|-id=591 bgcolor=#fefefe
| 28591 Racheldilger ||  ||  || March 11, 2000 || Anderson Mesa || LONEOS || — || align=right | 3.0 km || 
|-id=592 bgcolor=#E9E9E9
| 28592 O'Leary ||  ||  || March 11, 2000 || Socorro || LINEAR || — || align=right | 3.3 km || 
|-id=593 bgcolor=#d6d6d6
| 28593 Ryanhamilton ||  ||  || March 11, 2000 || Anderson Mesa || LONEOS || EOS || align=right | 5.2 km || 
|-id=594 bgcolor=#E9E9E9
| 28594 Ronaldballouz ||  ||  || March 11, 2000 || Anderson Mesa || LONEOS || DOR || align=right | 11 km || 
|-id=595 bgcolor=#d6d6d6
| 28595 ||  || — || March 12, 2000 || Socorro || LINEAR || EOS || align=right | 6.0 km || 
|-id=596 bgcolor=#E9E9E9
| 28596 ||  || — || March 7, 2000 || Socorro || LINEAR || — || align=right | 2.8 km || 
|-id=597 bgcolor=#E9E9E9
| 28597 ||  || — || March 9, 2000 || Socorro || LINEAR || — || align=right | 4.9 km || 
|-id=598 bgcolor=#fefefe
| 28598 Apadmanabha ||  ||  || March 9, 2000 || Socorro || LINEAR || — || align=right | 2.5 km || 
|-id=599 bgcolor=#E9E9E9
| 28599 Terenzoni ||  ||  || March 11, 2000 || Catalina || CSS || EUN || align=right | 4.1 km || 
|-id=600 bgcolor=#fefefe
| 28600 Georgelucas ||  ||  || March 2, 2000 || Catalina || CSS || V || align=right | 2.2 km || 
|}

28601–28700 

|-bgcolor=#fefefe
| 28601 Benton ||  ||  || March 4, 2000 || Catalina || CSS || — || align=right | 2.9 km || 
|-id=602 bgcolor=#E9E9E9
| 28602 Westfall ||  ||  || March 4, 2000 || Catalina || CSS || — || align=right | 3.6 km || 
|-id=603 bgcolor=#E9E9E9
| 28603 Jenkins ||  ||  || March 4, 2000 || Catalina || CSS || — || align=right | 3.7 km || 
|-id=604 bgcolor=#d6d6d6
| 28604 ||  || — || March 5, 2000 || Haleakala || NEAT || THM || align=right | 9.1 km || 
|-id=605 bgcolor=#E9E9E9
| 28605 ||  || — || March 6, 2000 || Haleakala || NEAT || — || align=right | 2.4 km || 
|-id=606 bgcolor=#fefefe
| 28606 ||  || — || March 6, 2000 || Haleakala || NEAT || V || align=right | 2.2 km || 
|-id=607 bgcolor=#fefefe
| 28607 Jiayipeng ||  ||  || March 9, 2000 || Socorro || LINEAR || FLO || align=right | 3.1 km || 
|-id=608 bgcolor=#E9E9E9
| 28608 Sblomquist ||  ||  || March 12, 2000 || Anderson Mesa || LONEOS || — || align=right | 4.6 km || 
|-id=609 bgcolor=#E9E9E9
| 28609 Tsirvoulis ||  ||  || March 12, 2000 || Anderson Mesa || LONEOS || MIT || align=right | 6.4 km || 
|-id=610 bgcolor=#E9E9E9
| 28610 Stephenriggs ||  ||  || March 12, 2000 || Anderson Mesa || LONEOS || — || align=right | 14 km || 
|-id=611 bgcolor=#fefefe
| 28611 Liliapopova ||  ||  || March 5, 2000 || Socorro || LINEAR || — || align=right | 2.4 km || 
|-id=612 bgcolor=#d6d6d6
| 28612 ||  || — || March 25, 2000 || Kitt Peak || Spacewatch || — || align=right | 6.7 km || 
|-id=613 bgcolor=#E9E9E9
| 28613 ||  || — || March 29, 2000 || Oizumi || T. Kobayashi || — || align=right | 7.4 km || 
|-id=614 bgcolor=#fefefe
| 28614 Vejvoda ||  ||  || March 25, 2000 || Kleť || Kleť Obs. || — || align=right | 3.4 km || 
|-id=615 bgcolor=#d6d6d6
| 28615 ||  || — || March 31, 2000 || Reedy Creek || J. Broughton || — || align=right | 5.0 km || 
|-id=616 bgcolor=#E9E9E9
| 28616 ||  || — || March 28, 2000 || Socorro || LINEAR || — || align=right | 5.0 km || 
|-id=617 bgcolor=#d6d6d6
| 28617 ||  || — || March 29, 2000 || Socorro || LINEAR || — || align=right | 12 km || 
|-id=618 bgcolor=#fefefe
| 28618 Scibelli ||  ||  || March 29, 2000 || Socorro || LINEAR || — || align=right | 3.0 km || 
|-id=619 bgcolor=#d6d6d6
| 28619 ||  || — || March 29, 2000 || Socorro || LINEAR || — || align=right | 12 km || 
|-id=620 bgcolor=#fefefe
| 28620 ||  || — || March 27, 2000 || Anderson Mesa || LONEOS || — || align=right | 8.1 km || 
|-id=621 bgcolor=#fefefe
| 28621 ||  || — || March 27, 2000 || Anderson Mesa || LONEOS || — || align=right | 3.2 km || 
|-id=622 bgcolor=#d6d6d6
| 28622 ||  || — || March 27, 2000 || Anderson Mesa || LONEOS || — || align=right | 3.6 km || 
|-id=623 bgcolor=#fefefe
| 28623 ||  || — || March 27, 2000 || Anderson Mesa || LONEOS || — || align=right | 2.4 km || 
|-id=624 bgcolor=#fefefe
| 28624 ||  || — || March 28, 2000 || Socorro || LINEAR || — || align=right | 2.9 km || 
|-id=625 bgcolor=#fefefe
| 28625 Selvakumar ||  ||  || March 29, 2000 || Socorro || LINEAR || — || align=right | 2.8 km || 
|-id=626 bgcolor=#fefefe
| 28626 Meghanshea ||  ||  || March 29, 2000 || Socorro || LINEAR || — || align=right | 2.9 km || 
|-id=627 bgcolor=#d6d6d6
| 28627 ||  || — || March 29, 2000 || Socorro || LINEAR || — || align=right | 7.5 km || 
|-id=628 bgcolor=#d6d6d6
| 28628 Kensenshi ||  ||  || March 29, 2000 || Socorro || LINEAR || — || align=right | 8.2 km || 
|-id=629 bgcolor=#E9E9E9
| 28629 Solimano ||  ||  || March 29, 2000 || Socorro || LINEAR || — || align=right | 2.3 km || 
|-id=630 bgcolor=#fefefe
| 28630 Mayuri ||  ||  || March 29, 2000 || Socorro || LINEAR || FLO || align=right | 1.5 km || 
|-id=631 bgcolor=#d6d6d6
| 28631 Jacktakahashi ||  ||  || March 29, 2000 || Socorro || LINEAR || THM || align=right | 8.0 km || 
|-id=632 bgcolor=#E9E9E9
| 28632 Christraver ||  ||  || March 29, 2000 || Socorro || LINEAR || — || align=right | 3.1 km || 
|-id=633 bgcolor=#fefefe
| 28633 Ratripathi ||  ||  || March 29, 2000 || Socorro || LINEAR || — || align=right | 2.1 km || 
|-id=634 bgcolor=#E9E9E9
| 28634 ||  || — || March 29, 2000 || Socorro || LINEAR || — || align=right | 4.8 km || 
|-id=635 bgcolor=#fefefe
| 28635 ||  || — || March 28, 2000 || Socorro || LINEAR || — || align=right | 3.1 km || 
|-id=636 bgcolor=#fefefe
| 28636 Vasudevan ||  ||  || March 29, 2000 || Socorro || LINEAR || — || align=right | 2.5 km || 
|-id=637 bgcolor=#E9E9E9
| 28637 ||  || — || March 29, 2000 || Socorro || LINEAR || — || align=right | 5.8 km || 
|-id=638 bgcolor=#E9E9E9
| 28638 Joywang ||  ||  || March 30, 2000 || Socorro || LINEAR || MIS || align=right | 6.1 km || 
|-id=639 bgcolor=#d6d6d6
| 28639 ||  || — || March 30, 2000 || Socorro || LINEAR || EOS || align=right | 6.1 km || 
|-id=640 bgcolor=#d6d6d6
| 28640 Cathywong ||  ||  || March 30, 2000 || Socorro || LINEAR || — || align=right | 4.8 km || 
|-id=641 bgcolor=#E9E9E9
| 28641 ||  || — || March 30, 2000 || Socorro || LINEAR || DOR || align=right | 8.5 km || 
|-id=642 bgcolor=#fefefe
| 28642 Zbarsky ||  ||  || March 30, 2000 || Socorro || LINEAR || — || align=right | 1.9 km || 
|-id=643 bgcolor=#fefefe
| 28643 Kellyzhang ||  ||  || March 30, 2000 || Socorro || LINEAR || — || align=right | 6.2 km || 
|-id=644 bgcolor=#fefefe
| 28644 Michaelzhang ||  ||  || March 29, 2000 || Socorro || LINEAR || — || align=right | 2.3 km || 
|-id=645 bgcolor=#d6d6d6
| 28645 ||  || — || March 29, 2000 || Socorro || LINEAR || — || align=right | 5.5 km || 
|-id=646 bgcolor=#fefefe
| 28646 ||  || — || March 26, 2000 || Anderson Mesa || LONEOS || — || align=right | 2.5 km || 
|-id=647 bgcolor=#E9E9E9
| 28647 || 2000 GW || — || April 2, 2000 || Kitt Peak || Spacewatch || — || align=right | 3.0 km || 
|-id=648 bgcolor=#E9E9E9
| 28648 || 2000 GY || — || April 2, 2000 || Kitt Peak || Spacewatch || — || align=right | 3.1 km || 
|-id=649 bgcolor=#E9E9E9
| 28649 ||  || — || April 4, 2000 || Fountain Hills || C. W. Juels || — || align=right | 4.5 km || 
|-id=650 bgcolor=#d6d6d6
| 28650 ||  || — || April 5, 2000 || Socorro || LINEAR || EOS || align=right | 7.5 km || 
|-id=651 bgcolor=#E9E9E9
| 28651 ||  || — || April 5, 2000 || Socorro || LINEAR || — || align=right | 5.2 km || 
|-id=652 bgcolor=#fefefe
| 28652 Andybramante ||  ||  || April 5, 2000 || Socorro || LINEAR || NYS || align=right | 1.5 km || 
|-id=653 bgcolor=#E9E9E9
| 28653 Charliebrucker ||  ||  || April 5, 2000 || Socorro || LINEAR || — || align=right | 2.6 km || 
|-id=654 bgcolor=#E9E9E9
| 28654 Davidcaine ||  ||  || April 5, 2000 || Socorro || LINEAR || — || align=right | 3.2 km || 
|-id=655 bgcolor=#fefefe
| 28655 Erincolfax ||  ||  || April 5, 2000 || Socorro || LINEAR || — || align=right | 2.2 km || 
|-id=656 bgcolor=#fefefe
| 28656 Doreencurtin ||  ||  || April 5, 2000 || Socorro || LINEAR || — || align=right | 3.0 km || 
|-id=657 bgcolor=#fefefe
| 28657 Briandempsey ||  ||  || April 5, 2000 || Socorro || LINEAR || — || align=right | 2.1 km || 
|-id=658 bgcolor=#E9E9E9
| 28658 ||  || — || April 5, 2000 || Socorro || LINEAR || — || align=right | 8.9 km || 
|-id=659 bgcolor=#d6d6d6
| 28659 ||  || — || April 5, 2000 || Socorro || LINEAR || KOR || align=right | 5.2 km || 
|-id=660 bgcolor=#E9E9E9
| 28660 Derbes ||  ||  || April 5, 2000 || Socorro || LINEAR || — || align=right | 3.2 km || 
|-id=661 bgcolor=#d6d6d6
| 28661 Jimdickens ||  ||  || April 5, 2000 || Socorro || LINEAR || KOR || align=right | 3.8 km || 
|-id=662 bgcolor=#E9E9E9
| 28662 Ericduran ||  ||  || April 5, 2000 || Socorro || LINEAR || — || align=right | 3.9 km || 
|-id=663 bgcolor=#d6d6d6
| 28663 ||  || — || April 5, 2000 || Socorro || LINEAR || — || align=right | 10 km || 
|-id=664 bgcolor=#fefefe
| 28664 Maryellenfay ||  ||  || April 5, 2000 || Socorro || LINEAR || — || align=right | 1.8 km || 
|-id=665 bgcolor=#d6d6d6
| 28665 Theresafultz ||  ||  || April 5, 2000 || Socorro || LINEAR || KOR || align=right | 3.6 km || 
|-id=666 bgcolor=#fefefe
| 28666 Trudygessler ||  ||  || April 5, 2000 || Socorro || LINEAR || NYS || align=right | 1.9 km || 
|-id=667 bgcolor=#E9E9E9
| 28667 Whithagins ||  ||  || April 5, 2000 || Socorro || LINEAR || — || align=right | 4.9 km || 
|-id=668 bgcolor=#fefefe
| 28668 ||  || — || April 5, 2000 || Socorro || LINEAR || — || align=right | 2.9 km || 
|-id=669 bgcolor=#fefefe
| 28669 Bradhelsel ||  ||  || April 5, 2000 || Socorro || LINEAR || — || align=right | 1.6 km || 
|-id=670 bgcolor=#E9E9E9
| 28670 ||  || — || April 5, 2000 || Socorro || LINEAR || — || align=right | 9.1 km || 
|-id=671 bgcolor=#d6d6d6
| 28671 ||  || — || April 5, 2000 || Socorro || LINEAR || THM || align=right | 8.5 km || 
|-id=672 bgcolor=#fefefe
| 28672 Karolhiggins ||  ||  || April 5, 2000 || Socorro || LINEAR || — || align=right | 3.0 km || 
|-id=673 bgcolor=#fefefe
| 28673 Valholmes ||  ||  || April 5, 2000 || Socorro || LINEAR || — || align=right | 2.5 km || 
|-id=674 bgcolor=#fefefe
| 28674 ||  || — || April 5, 2000 || Socorro || LINEAR || — || align=right | 2.0 km || 
|-id=675 bgcolor=#d6d6d6
| 28675 Suejohnston ||  ||  || April 5, 2000 || Socorro || LINEAR || THM || align=right | 7.0 km || 
|-id=676 bgcolor=#fefefe
| 28676 Bethkoester ||  ||  || April 5, 2000 || Socorro || LINEAR || FLO || align=right | 2.8 km || 
|-id=677 bgcolor=#fefefe
| 28677 Laurakowalski ||  ||  || April 5, 2000 || Socorro || LINEAR || — || align=right | 2.6 km || 
|-id=678 bgcolor=#fefefe
| 28678 Lindquester ||  ||  || April 5, 2000 || Socorro || LINEAR || — || align=right | 3.8 km || 
|-id=679 bgcolor=#d6d6d6
| 28679 ||  || — || April 5, 2000 || Socorro || LINEAR || — || align=right | 5.0 km || 
|-id=680 bgcolor=#fefefe
| 28680 Sandralitvin ||  ||  || April 5, 2000 || Socorro || LINEAR || NYSslow || align=right | 2.5 km || 
|-id=681 bgcolor=#fefefe
| 28681 Loseke ||  ||  || April 5, 2000 || Socorro || LINEAR || — || align=right | 2.8 km || 
|-id=682 bgcolor=#E9E9E9
| 28682 Newhams ||  ||  || April 5, 2000 || Socorro || LINEAR || — || align=right | 3.1 km || 
|-id=683 bgcolor=#E9E9E9
| 28683 Victorostrik ||  ||  || April 5, 2000 || Socorro || LINEAR || — || align=right | 3.5 km || 
|-id=684 bgcolor=#d6d6d6
| 28684 ||  || — || April 5, 2000 || Socorro || LINEAR || — || align=right | 6.7 km || 
|-id=685 bgcolor=#d6d6d6
| 28685 ||  || — || April 5, 2000 || Socorro || LINEAR || — || align=right | 8.5 km || 
|-id=686 bgcolor=#E9E9E9
| 28686 Tamsenprofit ||  ||  || April 5, 2000 || Socorro || LINEAR || — || align=right | 3.3 km || 
|-id=687 bgcolor=#d6d6d6
| 28687 Reginareals ||  ||  || April 5, 2000 || Socorro || LINEAR || KOR || align=right | 3.5 km || 
|-id=688 bgcolor=#E9E9E9
| 28688 Diannerister ||  ||  || April 5, 2000 || Socorro || LINEAR || — || align=right | 7.2 km || 
|-id=689 bgcolor=#E9E9E9
| 28689 Rohrback ||  ||  || April 5, 2000 || Socorro || LINEAR || AGN || align=right | 2.6 km || 
|-id=690 bgcolor=#fefefe
| 28690 Beshellem ||  ||  || April 5, 2000 || Socorro || LINEAR || MAS || align=right | 2.8 km || 
|-id=691 bgcolor=#E9E9E9
| 28691 ||  || — || April 5, 2000 || Socorro || LINEAR || — || align=right | 8.7 km || 
|-id=692 bgcolor=#d6d6d6
| 28692 Chanleysmall ||  ||  || April 5, 2000 || Socorro || LINEAR || KOR || align=right | 4.0 km || 
|-id=693 bgcolor=#fefefe
| 28693 ||  || — || April 5, 2000 || Socorro || LINEAR || V || align=right | 2.2 km || 
|-id=694 bgcolor=#d6d6d6
| 28694 ||  || — || April 3, 2000 || Socorro || LINEAR || — || align=right | 8.8 km || 
|-id=695 bgcolor=#fefefe
| 28695 Zwanzig ||  ||  || April 4, 2000 || Socorro || LINEAR || — || align=right | 2.0 km || 
|-id=696 bgcolor=#E9E9E9
| 28696 ||  || — || April 4, 2000 || Socorro || LINEAR || — || align=right | 12 km || 
|-id=697 bgcolor=#E9E9E9
| 28697 Eitanacks ||  ||  || April 4, 2000 || Socorro || LINEAR || AGN || align=right | 3.9 km || 
|-id=698 bgcolor=#fefefe
| 28698 Aakshi ||  ||  || April 4, 2000 || Socorro || LINEAR || — || align=right | 2.3 km || 
|-id=699 bgcolor=#E9E9E9
| 28699 ||  || — || April 4, 2000 || Socorro || LINEAR || DOR || align=right | 9.1 km || 
|-id=700 bgcolor=#fefefe
| 28700 Balachandar ||  ||  || April 4, 2000 || Socorro || LINEAR || — || align=right | 2.9 km || 
|}

28701–28800 

|-bgcolor=#E9E9E9
| 28701 ||  || — || April 4, 2000 || Socorro || LINEAR || — || align=right | 8.2 km || 
|-id=702 bgcolor=#E9E9E9
| 28702 ||  || — || April 4, 2000 || Socorro || LINEAR || — || align=right | 5.8 km || 
|-id=703 bgcolor=#d6d6d6
| 28703 ||  || — || April 4, 2000 || Socorro || LINEAR || — || align=right | 5.8 km || 
|-id=704 bgcolor=#E9E9E9
| 28704 ||  || — || April 4, 2000 || Socorro || LINEAR || MIT || align=right | 5.2 km || 
|-id=705 bgcolor=#E9E9E9
| 28705 Michaelbecker ||  ||  || April 4, 2000 || Socorro || LINEAR || — || align=right | 3.1 km || 
|-id=706 bgcolor=#E9E9E9
| 28706 ||  || — || April 5, 2000 || Socorro || LINEAR || — || align=right | 3.5 km || 
|-id=707 bgcolor=#d6d6d6
| 28707 Drewbecker ||  ||  || April 6, 2000 || Socorro || LINEAR || KOR || align=right | 3.0 km || 
|-id=708 bgcolor=#d6d6d6
| 28708 ||  || — || April 6, 2000 || Socorro || LINEAR || VER || align=right | 10 km || 
|-id=709 bgcolor=#d6d6d6
| 28709 ||  || — || April 6, 2000 || Socorro || LINEAR || THM || align=right | 10 km || 
|-id=710 bgcolor=#fefefe
| 28710 Rebeccab ||  ||  || April 7, 2000 || Socorro || LINEAR || V || align=right | 2.2 km || 
|-id=711 bgcolor=#fefefe
| 28711 Oliverburnett ||  ||  || April 7, 2000 || Socorro || LINEAR || — || align=right | 2.4 km || 
|-id=712 bgcolor=#d6d6d6
| 28712 Elizabethcorn ||  ||  || April 7, 2000 || Socorro || LINEAR || — || align=right | 5.1 km || 
|-id=713 bgcolor=#fefefe
| 28713 ||  || — || April 7, 2000 || Socorro || LINEAR || — || align=right | 3.6 km || 
|-id=714 bgcolor=#fefefe
| 28714 Gandall ||  ||  || April 7, 2000 || Socorro || LINEAR || NYS || align=right | 2.6 km || 
|-id=715 bgcolor=#E9E9E9
| 28715 Garimella ||  ||  || April 7, 2000 || Socorro || LINEAR || — || align=right | 5.1 km || 
|-id=716 bgcolor=#fefefe
| 28716 Calebgonser ||  ||  || April 7, 2000 || Socorro || LINEAR || V || align=right | 3.0 km || 
|-id=717 bgcolor=#E9E9E9
| 28717 ||  || — || April 7, 2000 || Socorro || LINEAR || MAR || align=right | 3.4 km || 
|-id=718 bgcolor=#fefefe
| 28718 Rivergrace ||  ||  || April 7, 2000 || Socorro || LINEAR || V || align=right | 2.0 km || 
|-id=719 bgcolor=#fefefe
| 28719 Sahoolahan ||  ||  || April 7, 2000 || Socorro || LINEAR || MAS || align=right | 2.5 km || 
|-id=720 bgcolor=#E9E9E9
| 28720 Krystalrose ||  ||  || April 7, 2000 || Socorro || LINEAR || — || align=right | 3.2 km || 
|-id=721 bgcolor=#E9E9E9
| 28721 ||  || — || April 7, 2000 || Socorro || LINEAR || MAR || align=right | 5.4 km || 
|-id=722 bgcolor=#fefefe
| 28722 Dhruviyer ||  ||  || April 7, 2000 || Socorro || LINEAR || — || align=right | 3.0 km || 
|-id=723 bgcolor=#fefefe
| 28723 Cameronjones ||  ||  || April 7, 2000 || Socorro || LINEAR || FLO || align=right | 2.4 km || 
|-id=724 bgcolor=#fefefe
| 28724 ||  || — || April 2, 2000 || Anderson Mesa || LONEOS || FLO || align=right | 2.4 km || 
|-id=725 bgcolor=#fefefe
| 28725 ||  || — || April 5, 2000 || Socorro || LINEAR || — || align=right | 3.4 km || 
|-id=726 bgcolor=#E9E9E9
| 28726 Kailey-Steiner ||  ||  || April 6, 2000 || Socorro || LINEAR || — || align=right | 3.2 km || 
|-id=727 bgcolor=#E9E9E9
| 28727 ||  || — || April 6, 2000 || Socorro || LINEAR || — || align=right | 4.2 km || 
|-id=728 bgcolor=#E9E9E9
| 28728 ||  || — || April 6, 2000 || Kitt Peak || Spacewatch || — || align=right | 5.1 km || 
|-id=729 bgcolor=#fefefe
| 28729 Moivre ||  ||  || April 11, 2000 || Prescott || P. G. Comba || FLO || align=right | 3.7 km || 
|-id=730 bgcolor=#d6d6d6
| 28730 ||  || — || April 7, 2000 || Socorro || LINEAR || EMA || align=right | 9.4 km || 
|-id=731 bgcolor=#E9E9E9
| 28731 ||  || — || April 7, 2000 || Socorro || LINEAR || EUN || align=right | 4.4 km || 
|-id=732 bgcolor=#fefefe
| 28732 Rheakamat ||  ||  || April 7, 2000 || Socorro || LINEAR || V || align=right | 2.7 km || 
|-id=733 bgcolor=#d6d6d6
| 28733 ||  || — || April 7, 2000 || Socorro || LINEAR || — || align=right | 4.6 km || 
|-id=734 bgcolor=#fefefe
| 28734 Austinmccoy ||  ||  || April 7, 2000 || Socorro || LINEAR || — || align=right | 2.8 km || 
|-id=735 bgcolor=#fefefe
| 28735 ||  || — || April 7, 2000 || Socorro || LINEAR || V || align=right | 3.5 km || 
|-id=736 bgcolor=#fefefe
| 28736 ||  || — || April 12, 2000 || Haleakala || NEAT || — || align=right | 6.4 km || 
|-id=737 bgcolor=#fefefe
| 28737 Mohindra ||  ||  || April 7, 2000 || Socorro || LINEAR || V || align=right | 3.0 km || 
|-id=738 bgcolor=#fefefe
| 28738 Carolinolan ||  ||  || April 8, 2000 || Socorro || LINEAR || — || align=right | 3.0 km || 
|-id=739 bgcolor=#E9E9E9
| 28739 Julisauer ||  ||  || April 8, 2000 || Socorro || LINEAR || — || align=right | 7.0 km || 
|-id=740 bgcolor=#E9E9E9
| 28740 Nathansperry ||  ||  || April 12, 2000 || Socorro || LINEAR || PAD || align=right | 6.6 km || 
|-id=741 bgcolor=#d6d6d6
| 28741 ||  || — || April 12, 2000 || Socorro || LINEAR || — || align=right | 6.6 km || 
|-id=742 bgcolor=#fefefe
| 28742 Hannahsteele ||  ||  || April 12, 2000 || Socorro || LINEAR || V || align=right | 2.4 km || 
|-id=743 bgcolor=#E9E9E9
| 28743 ||  || — || April 7, 2000 || Anderson Mesa || LONEOS || GEF || align=right | 5.8 km || 
|-id=744 bgcolor=#fefefe
| 28744 ||  || — || April 7, 2000 || Anderson Mesa || LONEOS || — || align=right | 2.6 km || 
|-id=745 bgcolor=#fefefe
| 28745 ||  || — || April 7, 2000 || Kitt Peak || Spacewatch || — || align=right | 1.9 km || 
|-id=746 bgcolor=#fefefe
| 28746 ||  || — || April 5, 2000 || Socorro || LINEAR || NYS || align=right | 1.9 km || 
|-id=747 bgcolor=#d6d6d6
| 28747 Swintosky ||  ||  || April 5, 2000 || Socorro || LINEAR || KOR || align=right | 3.0 km || 
|-id=748 bgcolor=#fefefe
| 28748 ||  || — || April 7, 2000 || Socorro || LINEAR || — || align=right | 5.0 km || 
|-id=749 bgcolor=#fefefe
| 28749 ||  || — || April 7, 2000 || Socorro || LINEAR || V || align=right | 3.0 km || 
|-id=750 bgcolor=#fefefe
| 28750 Brennawallin ||  ||  || April 5, 2000 || Socorro || LINEAR || — || align=right | 2.8 km || 
|-id=751 bgcolor=#E9E9E9
| 28751 ||  || — || April 4, 2000 || Anderson Mesa || LONEOS || — || align=right | 2.2 km || 
|-id=752 bgcolor=#fefefe
| 28752 ||  || — || April 3, 2000 || Kitt Peak || Spacewatch || — || align=right | 2.0 km || 
|-id=753 bgcolor=#fefefe
| 28753 || 2000 HA || — || April 18, 2000 || Modra || L. Kornoš, A. Galád || PHO || align=right | 4.9 km || 
|-id=754 bgcolor=#d6d6d6
| 28754 ||  || — || April 25, 2000 || Višnjan Observatory || K. Korlević || — || align=right | 15 km || 
|-id=755 bgcolor=#d6d6d6
| 28755 ||  || — || April 27, 2000 || Kitt Peak || Spacewatch || KOR || align=right | 3.9 km || 
|-id=756 bgcolor=#d6d6d6
| 28756 ||  || — || April 24, 2000 || Kitt Peak || Spacewatch || — || align=right | 7.3 km || 
|-id=757 bgcolor=#d6d6d6
| 28757 Seanweber ||  ||  || April 27, 2000 || Socorro || LINEAR || — || align=right | 7.6 km || 
|-id=758 bgcolor=#d6d6d6
| 28758 ||  || — || April 27, 2000 || Socorro || LINEAR || THM || align=right | 11 km || 
|-id=759 bgcolor=#E9E9E9
| 28759 Joshwentzel ||  ||  || April 27, 2000 || Socorro || LINEAR || — || align=right | 3.0 km || 
|-id=760 bgcolor=#E9E9E9
| 28760 Grantwomble ||  ||  || April 28, 2000 || Socorro || LINEAR || — || align=right | 3.0 km || 
|-id=761 bgcolor=#fefefe
| 28761 ||  || — || April 28, 2000 || Socorro || LINEAR || — || align=right | 3.8 km || 
|-id=762 bgcolor=#d6d6d6
| 28762 ||  || — || April 28, 2000 || Socorro || LINEAR || — || align=right | 6.4 km || 
|-id=763 bgcolor=#d6d6d6
| 28763 ||  || — || April 28, 2000 || Socorro || LINEAR || THM || align=right | 9.6 km || 
|-id=764 bgcolor=#d6d6d6
| 28764 ||  || — || April 28, 2000 || Socorro || LINEAR || — || align=right | 7.2 km || 
|-id=765 bgcolor=#fefefe
| 28765 Katherinewu ||  ||  || April 28, 2000 || Socorro || LINEAR || — || align=right | 3.1 km || 
|-id=766 bgcolor=#d6d6d6
| 28766 Monge ||  ||  || April 29, 2000 || Prescott || P. G. Comba || — || align=right | 10 km || 
|-id=767 bgcolor=#fefefe
| 28767 ||  || — || April 24, 2000 || Kitt Peak || Spacewatch || MAS || align=right | 1.8 km || 
|-id=768 bgcolor=#fefefe
| 28768 ||  || — || April 28, 2000 || Socorro || LINEAR || — || align=right | 3.3 km || 
|-id=769 bgcolor=#fefefe
| 28769 ||  || — || April 24, 2000 || Anderson Mesa || LONEOS || — || align=right | 3.0 km || 
|-id=770 bgcolor=#E9E9E9
| 28770 Sarahrines ||  ||  || April 27, 2000 || Socorro || LINEAR || WIT || align=right | 3.1 km || 
|-id=771 bgcolor=#fefefe
| 28771 ||  || — || April 29, 2000 || Socorro || LINEAR || — || align=right | 2.4 km || 
|-id=772 bgcolor=#E9E9E9
| 28772 ||  || — || April 25, 2000 || Anderson Mesa || LONEOS || — || align=right | 7.4 km || 
|-id=773 bgcolor=#d6d6d6
| 28773 ||  || — || April 28, 2000 || Socorro || LINEAR || EOS || align=right | 10 km || 
|-id=774 bgcolor=#E9E9E9
| 28774 ||  || — || April 28, 2000 || Socorro || LINEAR || EUN || align=right | 3.6 km || 
|-id=775 bgcolor=#d6d6d6
| 28775 ||  || — || April 28, 2000 || Socorro || LINEAR || — || align=right | 13 km || 
|-id=776 bgcolor=#E9E9E9
| 28776 ||  || — || April 28, 2000 || Socorro || LINEAR || — || align=right | 4.9 km || 
|-id=777 bgcolor=#E9E9E9
| 28777 ||  || — || April 28, 2000 || Socorro || LINEAR || — || align=right | 3.5 km || 
|-id=778 bgcolor=#E9E9E9
| 28778 Michdelucia ||  ||  || April 29, 2000 || Socorro || LINEAR || AGN || align=right | 3.4 km || 
|-id=779 bgcolor=#fefefe
| 28779 Acthieke ||  ||  || April 29, 2000 || Socorro || LINEAR || — || align=right | 2.7 km || 
|-id=780 bgcolor=#fefefe
| 28780 Lisadeaver ||  ||  || April 29, 2000 || Socorro || LINEAR || — || align=right | 2.3 km || 
|-id=781 bgcolor=#d6d6d6
| 28781 Timothylohr ||  ||  || April 29, 2000 || Socorro || LINEAR || — || align=right | 7.1 km || 
|-id=782 bgcolor=#fefefe
| 28782 Mechling ||  ||  || April 29, 2000 || Socorro || LINEAR || — || align=right | 2.0 km || 
|-id=783 bgcolor=#fefefe
| 28783 ||  || — || April 29, 2000 || Socorro || LINEAR || NYS || align=right | 2.6 km || 
|-id=784 bgcolor=#d6d6d6
| 28784 Deringer ||  ||  || April 29, 2000 || Socorro || LINEAR || KOR || align=right | 4.7 km || 
|-id=785 bgcolor=#E9E9E9
| 28785 Woodjohn ||  ||  || April 29, 2000 || Socorro || LINEAR || — || align=right | 4.0 km || 
|-id=786 bgcolor=#E9E9E9
| 28786 ||  || — || April 29, 2000 || Socorro || LINEAR || — || align=right | 4.9 km || 
|-id=787 bgcolor=#E9E9E9
| 28787 Peterpinko ||  ||  || April 29, 2000 || Socorro || LINEAR || — || align=right | 3.6 km || 
|-id=788 bgcolor=#fefefe
| 28788 Hayes-Gehrke ||  ||  || April 24, 2000 || Anderson Mesa || LONEOS || NYS || align=right | 3.8 km || 
|-id=789 bgcolor=#d6d6d6
| 28789 ||  || — || April 24, 2000 || Kitt Peak || Spacewatch || THM || align=right | 6.1 km || 
|-id=790 bgcolor=#E9E9E9
| 28790 ||  || — || April 24, 2000 || Kitt Peak || Spacewatch || — || align=right | 3.0 km || 
|-id=791 bgcolor=#d6d6d6
| 28791 Edithsykeslowell ||  ||  || April 25, 2000 || Anderson Mesa || LONEOS || — || align=right | 5.7 km || 
|-id=792 bgcolor=#E9E9E9
| 28792 Davidlowell ||  ||  || April 25, 2000 || Anderson Mesa || LONEOS || HEN || align=right | 2.4 km || 
|-id=793 bgcolor=#E9E9E9
| 28793 Donaldpaul ||  ||  || April 25, 2000 || Anderson Mesa || LONEOS || — || align=right | 4.4 km || 
|-id=794 bgcolor=#fefefe
| 28794 Crowley ||  ||  || April 26, 2000 || Anderson Mesa || LONEOS || — || align=right | 2.6 km || 
|-id=795 bgcolor=#fefefe
| 28795 ||  || — || April 26, 2000 || Anderson Mesa || LONEOS || FLO || align=right | 2.9 km || 
|-id=796 bgcolor=#E9E9E9
| 28796 ||  || — || April 26, 2000 || Anderson Mesa || LONEOS || — || align=right | 6.2 km || 
|-id=797 bgcolor=#d6d6d6
| 28797 ||  || — || April 27, 2000 || Socorro || LINEAR || EOS || align=right | 5.2 km || 
|-id=798 bgcolor=#E9E9E9
| 28798 ||  || — || April 25, 2000 || Anderson Mesa || LONEOS || — || align=right | 7.9 km || 
|-id=799 bgcolor=#fefefe
| 28799 ||  || — || April 25, 2000 || Anderson Mesa || LONEOS || — || align=right | 2.7 km || 
|-id=800 bgcolor=#fefefe
| 28800 Speth ||  ||  || April 27, 2000 || Socorro || LINEAR || — || align=right | 3.6 km || 
|}

28801–28900 

|-bgcolor=#fefefe
| 28801 Maryanderson ||  ||  || April 27, 2000 || Socorro || LINEAR || — || align=right | 2.9 km || 
|-id=802 bgcolor=#fefefe
| 28802 Boborino ||  ||  || April 28, 2000 || Socorro || LINEAR || — || align=right | 3.7 km || 
|-id=803 bgcolor=#E9E9E9
| 28803 Roe ||  ||  || April 28, 2000 || Anderson Mesa || LONEOS || MAR || align=right | 2.9 km || 
|-id=804 bgcolor=#E9E9E9
| 28804 ||  || — || April 28, 2000 || Socorro || LINEAR || — || align=right | 3.6 km || 
|-id=805 bgcolor=#fefefe
| 28805 ||  || — || April 30, 2000 || Anderson Mesa || LONEOS || — || align=right | 3.5 km || 
|-id=806 bgcolor=#E9E9E9
| 28806 ||  || — || April 30, 2000 || Haleakala || NEAT || EUN || align=right | 3.8 km || 
|-id=807 bgcolor=#fefefe
| 28807 Lisawaller ||  ||  || April 29, 2000 || Socorro || LINEAR || — || align=right | 2.5 km || 
|-id=808 bgcolor=#E9E9E9
| 28808 Ananthnarayan ||  ||  || April 28, 2000 || Socorro || LINEAR || — || align=right | 5.4 km || 
|-id=809 bgcolor=#E9E9E9
| 28809 ||  || — || April 27, 2000 || Anderson Mesa || LONEOS || — || align=right | 3.0 km || 
|-id=810 bgcolor=#E9E9E9
| 28810 Suchandler ||  ||  || May 1, 2000 || Socorro || LINEAR || — || align=right | 6.3 km || 
|-id=811 bgcolor=#d6d6d6
| 28811 ||  || — || May 4, 2000 || Socorro || LINEAR || — || align=right | 11 km || 
|-id=812 bgcolor=#E9E9E9
| 28812 ||  || — || May 3, 2000 || Socorro || LINEAR || — || align=right | 3.0 km || 
|-id=813 bgcolor=#d6d6d6
| 28813 Jeffreykurtz ||  ||  || May 6, 2000 || Socorro || LINEAR || — || align=right | 7.3 km || 
|-id=814 bgcolor=#E9E9E9
| 28814 ||  || — || May 5, 2000 || Socorro || LINEAR || DOR || align=right | 8.6 km || 
|-id=815 bgcolor=#d6d6d6
| 28815 ||  || — || May 6, 2000 || Socorro || LINEAR || — || align=right | 8.5 km || 
|-id=816 bgcolor=#fefefe
| 28816 Kimneville ||  ||  || May 6, 2000 || Socorro || LINEAR || NYS || align=right | 2.3 km || 
|-id=817 bgcolor=#fefefe
| 28817 Simoneflood ||  ||  || May 6, 2000 || Socorro || LINEAR || — || align=right | 3.0 km || 
|-id=818 bgcolor=#fefefe
| 28818 Kellyryan ||  ||  || May 6, 2000 || Socorro || LINEAR || — || align=right | 2.8 km || 
|-id=819 bgcolor=#fefefe
| 28819 Karinritchey ||  ||  || May 6, 2000 || Socorro || LINEAR || V || align=right | 3.2 km || 
|-id=820 bgcolor=#fefefe
| 28820 Sylrobertson ||  ||  || May 7, 2000 || Socorro || LINEAR || — || align=right | 3.7 km || 
|-id=821 bgcolor=#fefefe
| 28821 Harryanselmo ||  ||  || May 7, 2000 || Socorro || LINEAR || FLO || align=right | 2.6 km || 
|-id=822 bgcolor=#E9E9E9
| 28822 Angelabarker ||  ||  || May 7, 2000 || Socorro || LINEAR || — || align=right | 2.9 km || 
|-id=823 bgcolor=#E9E9E9
| 28823 Archibald ||  ||  || May 7, 2000 || Socorro || LINEAR || — || align=right | 3.5 km || 
|-id=824 bgcolor=#d6d6d6
| 28824 Marlablair ||  ||  || May 7, 2000 || Socorro || LINEAR || HYG || align=right | 4.7 km || 
|-id=825 bgcolor=#E9E9E9
| 28825 Bryangoehring ||  ||  || May 7, 2000 || Socorro || LINEAR || — || align=right | 6.6 km || 
|-id=826 bgcolor=#E9E9E9
| 28826 ||  || — || May 7, 2000 || Socorro || LINEAR || PAD || align=right | 7.6 km || 
|-id=827 bgcolor=#E9E9E9
| 28827 ||  || — || May 7, 2000 || Socorro || LINEAR || — || align=right | 5.9 km || 
|-id=828 bgcolor=#fefefe
| 28828 Aalamiharandi ||  ||  || May 7, 2000 || Socorro || LINEAR || — || align=right | 5.5 km || 
|-id=829 bgcolor=#E9E9E9
| 28829 Abelsky ||  ||  || May 7, 2000 || Socorro || LINEAR || — || align=right | 2.7 km || 
|-id=830 bgcolor=#d6d6d6
| 28830 ||  || — || May 7, 2000 || Socorro || LINEAR || — || align=right | 6.4 km || 
|-id=831 bgcolor=#E9E9E9
| 28831 Abu-Alshaikh ||  ||  || May 7, 2000 || Socorro || LINEAR || — || align=right | 3.4 km || 
|-id=832 bgcolor=#d6d6d6
| 28832 Akana ||  ||  || May 7, 2000 || Socorro || LINEAR || — || align=right | 3.7 km || 
|-id=833 bgcolor=#d6d6d6
| 28833 Arunachalam ||  ||  || May 7, 2000 || Socorro || LINEAR || KOR || align=right | 3.3 km || 
|-id=834 bgcolor=#d6d6d6
| 28834 ||  || — || May 7, 2000 || Socorro || LINEAR || KOR || align=right | 5.1 km || 
|-id=835 bgcolor=#d6d6d6
| 28835 ||  || — || May 7, 2000 || Socorro || LINEAR || — || align=right | 9.6 km || 
|-id=836 bgcolor=#fefefe
| 28836 Ashmore ||  ||  || May 7, 2000 || Socorro || LINEAR || — || align=right | 2.5 km || 
|-id=837 bgcolor=#E9E9E9
| 28837 Nibalachandar ||  ||  || May 7, 2000 || Socorro || LINEAR || — || align=right | 6.1 km || 
|-id=838 bgcolor=#E9E9E9
| 28838 ||  || — || May 6, 2000 || Socorro || LINEAR || MAR || align=right | 4.0 km || 
|-id=839 bgcolor=#d6d6d6
| 28839 ||  || — || May 6, 2000 || Socorro || LINEAR || — || align=right | 5.3 km || 
|-id=840 bgcolor=#E9E9E9
| 28840 ||  || — || May 7, 2000 || Socorro || LINEAR || — || align=right | 4.2 km || 
|-id=841 bgcolor=#E9E9E9
| 28841 Kelseybarter ||  ||  || May 7, 2000 || Socorro || LINEAR || — || align=right | 3.1 km || 
|-id=842 bgcolor=#d6d6d6
| 28842 Bhowmik ||  ||  || May 7, 2000 || Socorro || LINEAR || KOR || align=right | 3.8 km || 
|-id=843 bgcolor=#d6d6d6
| 28843 ||  || — || May 7, 2000 || Socorro || LINEAR || THM || align=right | 7.6 km || 
|-id=844 bgcolor=#fefefe
| 28844 ||  || — || May 9, 2000 || Socorro || LINEAR || — || align=right | 4.2 km || 
|-id=845 bgcolor=#fefefe
| 28845 ||  || — || May 9, 2000 || Socorro || LINEAR || ERI || align=right | 5.7 km || 
|-id=846 bgcolor=#E9E9E9
| 28846 ||  || — || May 9, 2000 || Socorro || LINEAR || — || align=right | 6.2 km || 
|-id=847 bgcolor=#E9E9E9
| 28847 ||  || — || May 9, 2000 || Socorro || LINEAR || — || align=right | 5.2 km || 
|-id=848 bgcolor=#d6d6d6
| 28848 Nicolemarie ||  ||  || May 9, 2000 || Socorro || LINEAR || KOR || align=right | 4.8 km || 
|-id=849 bgcolor=#E9E9E9
| 28849 ||  || — || May 6, 2000 || Socorro || LINEAR || EUN || align=right | 4.4 km || 
|-id=850 bgcolor=#d6d6d6
| 28850 ||  || — || May 6, 2000 || Socorro || LINEAR || — || align=right | 9.5 km || 
|-id=851 bgcolor=#fefefe
| 28851 Londonbolsius ||  ||  || May 6, 2000 || Socorro || LINEAR || — || align=right | 5.9 km || 
|-id=852 bgcolor=#E9E9E9
| 28852 Westonbraun ||  ||  || May 6, 2000 || Socorro || LINEAR || — || align=right | 4.4 km || 
|-id=853 bgcolor=#d6d6d6
| 28853 Bukhamsin ||  ||  || May 6, 2000 || Socorro || LINEAR || KOR || align=right | 4.3 km || 
|-id=854 bgcolor=#fefefe
| 28854 Budisteanu ||  ||  || May 6, 2000 || Socorro || LINEAR || — || align=right | 3.0 km || 
|-id=855 bgcolor=#fefefe
| 28855 Burchell ||  ||  || May 6, 2000 || Socorro || LINEAR || — || align=right | 3.4 km || 
|-id=856 bgcolor=#E9E9E9
| 28856 ||  || — || May 6, 2000 || Socorro || LINEAR || — || align=right | 5.2 km || 
|-id=857 bgcolor=#E9E9E9
| 28857 ||  || — || May 7, 2000 || Socorro || LINEAR || slow || align=right | 8.3 km || 
|-id=858 bgcolor=#fefefe
| 28858 ||  || — || May 7, 2000 || Socorro || LINEAR || — || align=right | 4.5 km || 
|-id=859 bgcolor=#E9E9E9
| 28859 ||  || — || May 7, 2000 || Socorro || LINEAR || ADE || align=right | 9.3 km || 
|-id=860 bgcolor=#E9E9E9
| 28860 Cappelletto ||  ||  || May 7, 2000 || Socorro || LINEAR || — || align=right | 3.0 km || 
|-id=861 bgcolor=#d6d6d6
| 28861 ||  || — || May 7, 2000 || Socorro || LINEAR || — || align=right | 20 km || 
|-id=862 bgcolor=#E9E9E9
| 28862 ||  || — || May 5, 2000 || Socorro || LINEAR || — || align=right | 7.8 km || 
|-id=863 bgcolor=#d6d6d6
| 28863 ||  || — || May 6, 2000 || Socorro || LINEAR || — || align=right | 9.6 km || 
|-id=864 bgcolor=#E9E9E9
| 28864 ||  || — || May 1, 2000 || Anderson Mesa || LONEOS || MAR || align=right | 5.7 km || 
|-id=865 bgcolor=#fefefe
| 28865 ||  || — || May 4, 2000 || Kitt Peak || Spacewatch || V || align=right | 2.6 km || 
|-id=866 bgcolor=#fefefe
| 28866 Chakraborty ||  ||  || May 6, 2000 || Socorro || LINEAR || — || align=right | 3.3 km || 
|-id=867 bgcolor=#fefefe
| 28867 ||  || — || May 7, 2000 || Socorro || LINEAR || — || align=right | 3.2 km || 
|-id=868 bgcolor=#E9E9E9
| 28868 Rianchandra ||  ||  || May 7, 2000 || Socorro || LINEAR || — || align=right | 7.6 km || 
|-id=869 bgcolor=#E9E9E9
| 28869 Chaubal ||  ||  || May 5, 2000 || Socorro || LINEAR || — || align=right | 3.0 km || 
|-id=870 bgcolor=#E9E9E9
| 28870 ||  || — || May 2, 2000 || Socorro || LINEAR || WAT || align=right | 5.7 km || 
|-id=871 bgcolor=#d6d6d6
| 28871 ||  || — || May 27, 2000 || Socorro || LINEAR || KOR || align=right | 5.1 km || 
|-id=872 bgcolor=#d6d6d6
| 28872 ||  || — || May 27, 2000 || Socorro || LINEAR || — || align=right | 7.3 km || 
|-id=873 bgcolor=#d6d6d6
| 28873 ||  || — || May 27, 2000 || Socorro || LINEAR || — || align=right | 9.2 km || 
|-id=874 bgcolor=#fefefe
| 28874 Michaelchen ||  ||  || May 28, 2000 || Socorro || LINEAR || NYS || align=right | 3.0 km || 
|-id=875 bgcolor=#d6d6d6
| 28875 ||  || — || May 28, 2000 || Socorro || LINEAR || HYG || align=right | 12 km || 
|-id=876 bgcolor=#d6d6d6
| 28876 ||  || — || May 28, 2000 || Socorro || LINEAR || slow || align=right | 16 km || 
|-id=877 bgcolor=#d6d6d6
| 28877 ||  || — || May 28, 2000 || Socorro || LINEAR || — || align=right | 6.8 km || 
|-id=878 bgcolor=#E9E9E9
| 28878 Segner ||  ||  || May 26, 2000 || Ondřejov || P. Kušnirák || — || align=right | 3.4 km || 
|-id=879 bgcolor=#d6d6d6
| 28879 ||  || — || May 28, 2000 || Socorro || LINEAR || — || align=right | 10 km || 
|-id=880 bgcolor=#d6d6d6
| 28880 ||  || — || May 27, 2000 || Socorro || LINEAR || EOS || align=right | 7.3 km || 
|-id=881 bgcolor=#E9E9E9
| 28881 ||  || — || May 27, 2000 || Socorro || LINEAR || — || align=right | 8.1 km || 
|-id=882 bgcolor=#d6d6d6
| 28882 ||  || — || May 27, 2000 || Socorro || LINEAR || — || align=right | 12 km || 
|-id=883 bgcolor=#E9E9E9
| 28883 ||  || — || May 24, 2000 || Anderson Mesa || LONEOS || — || align=right | 4.8 km || 
|-id=884 bgcolor=#d6d6d6
| 28884 Youngjunchoi ||  ||  || May 27, 2000 || Anderson Mesa || LONEOS || ALA || align=right | 11 km || 
|-id=885 bgcolor=#E9E9E9
| 28885 ||  || — || May 27, 2000 || Socorro || LINEAR || GEF || align=right | 6.5 km || 
|-id=886 bgcolor=#E9E9E9
| 28886 Ericajawin ||  ||  || May 24, 2000 || Anderson Mesa || LONEOS || MAR || align=right | 3.5 km || 
|-id=887 bgcolor=#fefefe
| 28887 ||  || — || May 24, 2000 || Anderson Mesa || LONEOS || — || align=right | 4.4 km || 
|-id=888 bgcolor=#E9E9E9
| 28888 ||  || — || May 25, 2000 || Anderson Mesa || LONEOS || — || align=right | 4.0 km || 
|-id=889 bgcolor=#d6d6d6
| 28889 ||  || — || May 26, 2000 || Anderson Mesa || LONEOS || EOS || align=right | 6.1 km || 
|-id=890 bgcolor=#E9E9E9
| 28890 ||  || — || May 27, 2000 || Anderson Mesa || LONEOS || — || align=right | 2.9 km || 
|-id=891 bgcolor=#E9E9E9
| 28891 ||  || — || May 27, 2000 || Socorro || LINEAR || — || align=right | 4.1 km || 
|-id=892 bgcolor=#fefefe
| 28892 ||  || — || June 4, 2000 || Socorro || LINEAR || — || align=right | 4.8 km || 
|-id=893 bgcolor=#fefefe
| 28893 ||  || — || June 6, 2000 || Kitt Peak || Spacewatch || — || align=right | 3.3 km || 
|-id=894 bgcolor=#fefefe
| 28894 Ryanchung ||  ||  || June 5, 2000 || Socorro || LINEAR || SUL || align=right | 8.4 km || 
|-id=895 bgcolor=#d6d6d6
| 28895 ||  || — || June 6, 2000 || Socorro || LINEAR || — || align=right | 11 km || 
|-id=896 bgcolor=#E9E9E9
| 28896 ||  || — || June 1, 2000 || Socorro || LINEAR || — || align=right | 5.5 km || 
|-id=897 bgcolor=#E9E9E9
| 28897 ||  || — || June 1, 2000 || Socorro || LINEAR || EUN || align=right | 6.3 km || 
|-id=898 bgcolor=#E9E9E9
| 28898 ||  || — || June 4, 2000 || Socorro || LINEAR || MAR || align=right | 4.4 km || 
|-id=899 bgcolor=#d6d6d6
| 28899 ||  || — || June 4, 2000 || Socorro || LINEAR || — || align=right | 14 km || 
|-id=900 bgcolor=#E9E9E9
| 28900 ||  || — || June 4, 2000 || Socorro || LINEAR || EUN || align=right | 5.5 km || 
|}

28901–29000 

|-bgcolor=#d6d6d6
| 28901 ||  || — || June 6, 2000 || Socorro || LINEAR || — || align=right | 6.2 km || 
|-id=902 bgcolor=#fefefe
| 28902 ||  || — || June 4, 2000 || Haleakala || NEAT || V || align=right | 2.6 km || 
|-id=903 bgcolor=#E9E9E9
| 28903 ||  || — || June 1, 2000 || Haleakala || NEAT || — || align=right | 5.1 km || 
|-id=904 bgcolor=#d6d6d6
| 28904 || 2000 ML || — || June 20, 2000 || Haleakala || NEAT || URS || align=right | 16 km || 
|-id=905 bgcolor=#E9E9E9
| 28905 || 2000 MQ || — || June 24, 2000 || Haleakala || NEAT || GEF || align=right | 4.7 km || 
|-id=906 bgcolor=#E9E9E9
| 28906 ||  || — || June 24, 2000 || Haleakala || NEAT || — || align=right | 6.3 km || 
|-id=907 bgcolor=#fefefe
| 28907 ||  || — || June 25, 2000 || Kitt Peak || Spacewatch || — || align=right | 2.6 km || 
|-id=908 bgcolor=#d6d6d6
| 28908 ||  || — || July 4, 2000 || Kitt Peak || Spacewatch || VER || align=right | 11 km || 
|-id=909 bgcolor=#E9E9E9
| 28909 ||  || — || July 7, 2000 || Socorro || LINEAR || — || align=right | 7.8 km || 
|-id=910 bgcolor=#E9E9E9
| 28910 ||  || — || July 10, 2000 || Valinhos || P. R. Holvorcem || GEF || align=right | 4.7 km || 
|-id=911 bgcolor=#E9E9E9
| 28911 ||  || — || July 5, 2000 || Anderson Mesa || LONEOS || — || align=right | 5.6 km || 
|-id=912 bgcolor=#d6d6d6
| 28912 Sonahosseini ||  ||  || July 4, 2000 || Anderson Mesa || LONEOS || SYL7:4 || align=right | 13 km || 
|-id=913 bgcolor=#E9E9E9
| 28913 || 2000 OT || — || July 23, 2000 || Reedy Creek || J. Broughton || — || align=right | 6.5 km || 
|-id=914 bgcolor=#d6d6d6
| 28914 ||  || — || July 23, 2000 || Socorro || LINEAR || EOS || align=right | 7.4 km || 
|-id=915 bgcolor=#d6d6d6
| 28915 ||  || — || July 23, 2000 || Socorro || LINEAR || THM || align=right | 7.7 km || 
|-id=916 bgcolor=#fefefe
| 28916 Logancollins ||  ||  || July 31, 2000 || Socorro || LINEAR || V || align=right | 1.7 km || 
|-id=917 bgcolor=#d6d6d6
| 28917 Zacollins ||  ||  || August 24, 2000 || Socorro || LINEAR || THM || align=right | 6.6 km || 
|-id=918 bgcolor=#d6d6d6
| 28918 ||  || — || August 24, 2000 || Socorro || LINEAR || 3:2 || align=right | 18 km || 
|-id=919 bgcolor=#fefefe
| 28919 ||  || — || August 24, 2000 || Socorro || LINEAR || NYS || align=right | 2.9 km || 
|-id=920 bgcolor=#d6d6d6
| 28920 ||  || — || August 25, 2000 || Socorro || LINEAR || — || align=right | 5.0 km || 
|-id=921 bgcolor=#d6d6d6
| 28921 ||  || — || August 25, 2000 || Socorro || LINEAR || — || align=right | 4.9 km || 
|-id=922 bgcolor=#d6d6d6
| 28922 ||  || — || August 26, 2000 || Socorro || LINEAR || — || align=right | 19 km || 
|-id=923 bgcolor=#d6d6d6
| 28923 ||  || — || August 31, 2000 || Socorro || LINEAR || EOS || align=right | 6.9 km || 
|-id=924 bgcolor=#E9E9E9
| 28924 Jennanncsele ||  ||  || August 31, 2000 || Socorro || LINEAR || — || align=right | 2.7 km || 
|-id=925 bgcolor=#d6d6d6
| 28925 ||  || — || August 31, 2000 || Socorro || LINEAR || — || align=right | 9.7 km || 
|-id=926 bgcolor=#d6d6d6
| 28926 ||  || — || August 20, 2000 || Anderson Mesa || LONEOS || — || align=right | 12 km || 
|-id=927 bgcolor=#fefefe
| 28927 ||  || — || September 1, 2000 || Socorro || LINEAR || — || align=right | 3.6 km || 
|-id=928 bgcolor=#d6d6d6
| 28928 ||  || — || September 1, 2000 || Socorro || LINEAR || — || align=right | 11 km || 
|-id=929 bgcolor=#d6d6d6
| 28929 ||  || — || September 1, 2000 || Socorro || LINEAR || — || align=right | 11 km || 
|-id=930 bgcolor=#d6d6d6
| 28930 ||  || — || September 1, 2000 || Socorro || LINEAR || — || align=right | 5.4 km || 
|-id=931 bgcolor=#d6d6d6
| 28931 ||  || — || September 3, 2000 || Socorro || LINEAR || EOS || align=right | 7.9 km || 
|-id=932 bgcolor=#d6d6d6
| 28932 ||  || — || September 5, 2000 || Anderson Mesa || LONEOS || — || align=right | 14 km || 
|-id=933 bgcolor=#d6d6d6
| 28933 ||  || — || September 25, 2000 || Višnjan Observatory || K. Korlević || — || align=right | 10 km || 
|-id=934 bgcolor=#d6d6d6
| 28934 Meagancurrie ||  ||  || September 24, 2000 || Socorro || LINEAR || — || align=right | 7.2 km || 
|-id=935 bgcolor=#fefefe
| 28935 Kevincyr ||  ||  || September 24, 2000 || Socorro || LINEAR || — || align=right | 2.7 km || 
|-id=936 bgcolor=#E9E9E9
| 28936 Dalapati ||  ||  || September 23, 2000 || Socorro || LINEAR || — || align=right | 8.9 km || 
|-id=937 bgcolor=#d6d6d6
| 28937 ||  || — || September 21, 2000 || Haleakala || NEAT || EOS || align=right | 5.8 km || 
|-id=938 bgcolor=#d6d6d6
| 28938 ||  || — || September 27, 2000 || Socorro || LINEAR || ALA || align=right | 18 km || 
|-id=939 bgcolor=#E9E9E9
| 28939 ||  || — || October 4, 2000 || Socorro || LINEAR || HNS || align=right | 3.9 km || 
|-id=940 bgcolor=#d6d6d6
| 28940 ||  || — || October 22, 2000 || Višnjan Observatory || K. Korlević || — || align=right | 7.3 km || 
|-id=941 bgcolor=#E9E9E9
| 28941 ||  || — || October 24, 2000 || Socorro || LINEAR || MAR || align=right | 4.6 km || 
|-id=942 bgcolor=#d6d6d6
| 28942 Yennydieguez ||  ||  || October 24, 2000 || Socorro || LINEAR || — || align=right | 7.5 km || 
|-id=943 bgcolor=#E9E9E9
| 28943 ||  || — || October 24, 2000 || Socorro || LINEAR || AGN || align=right | 4.0 km || 
|-id=944 bgcolor=#E9E9E9
| 28944 ||  || — || October 25, 2000 || Socorro || LINEAR || — || align=right | 3.6 km || 
|-id=945 bgcolor=#fefefe
| 28945 Taideding ||  ||  || October 24, 2000 || Socorro || LINEAR || — || align=right | 2.4 km || 
|-id=946 bgcolor=#fefefe
| 28946 ||  || — || November 3, 2000 || Socorro || LINEAR || — || align=right | 2.6 km || 
|-id=947 bgcolor=#E9E9E9
| 28947 ||  || — || November 22, 2000 || Haleakala || NEAT || MAR || align=right | 4.6 km || 
|-id=948 bgcolor=#E9E9E9
| 28948 Disalvo ||  ||  || November 20, 2000 || Socorro || LINEAR || — || align=right | 3.2 km || 
|-id=949 bgcolor=#d6d6d6
| 28949 ||  || — || November 21, 2000 || Socorro || LINEAR || — || align=right | 15 km || 
|-id=950 bgcolor=#d6d6d6
| 28950 Ailisdooner ||  ||  || November 19, 2000 || Socorro || LINEAR || EOS || align=right | 4.2 km || 
|-id=951 bgcolor=#d6d6d6
| 28951 ||  || — || November 29, 2000 || Haleakala || NEAT || BRA || align=right | 8.8 km || 
|-id=952 bgcolor=#fefefe
| 28952 Ericepstein ||  ||  || December 30, 2000 || Socorro || LINEAR || NYS || align=right | 2.6 km || 
|-id=953 bgcolor=#E9E9E9
| 28953 Hollyerickson ||  ||  || December 30, 2000 || Socorro || LINEAR || — || align=right | 3.7 km || 
|-id=954 bgcolor=#E9E9E9
| 28954 Feiyiou ||  ||  || December 30, 2000 || Socorro || LINEAR || — || align=right | 7.4 km || 
|-id=955 bgcolor=#fefefe
| 28955 Kaliadeborah ||  ||  || December 30, 2000 || Socorro || LINEAR || NYS || align=right | 3.9 km || 
|-id=956 bgcolor=#d6d6d6
| 28956 ||  || — || January 15, 2001 || Oizumi || T. Kobayashi || — || align=right | 8.9 km || 
|-id=957 bgcolor=#fefefe
| 28957 Danielfulop ||  ||  || January 21, 2001 || Socorro || LINEAR || — || align=right | 2.4 km || 
|-id=958 bgcolor=#C2FFFF
| 28958 Binns ||  ||  || February 13, 2001 || Socorro || LINEAR || L4ERY || align=right | 22 km || 
|-id=959 bgcolor=#d6d6d6
| 28959 ||  || — || February 19, 2001 || Socorro || LINEAR || EUP || align=right | 18 km || 
|-id=960 bgcolor=#C2FFFF
| 28960 ||  || — || February 22, 2001 || Kitt Peak || Spacewatch || L4 || align=right | 17 km || 
|-id=961 bgcolor=#fefefe
| 28961 ||  || — || March 19, 2001 || Socorro || LINEAR || — || align=right | 2.7 km || 
|-id=962 bgcolor=#d6d6d6
| 28962 ||  || — || March 19, 2001 || Socorro || LINEAR || — || align=right | 17 km || 
|-id=963 bgcolor=#fefefe
| 28963 Tamyiu ||  ||  || March 29, 2001 || Desert Beaver || W. K. Y. Yeung || NYS || align=right | 2.0 km || 
|-id=964 bgcolor=#d6d6d6
| 28964 ||  || — || March 23, 2001 || Anderson Mesa || LONEOS || — || align=right | 9.6 km || 
|-id=965 bgcolor=#d6d6d6
| 28965 ||  || — || March 30, 2001 || Haleakala || NEAT || KOR || align=right | 3.3 km || 
|-id=966 bgcolor=#d6d6d6
| 28966 Yuyingshih ||  ||  || April 26, 2001 || Desert Beaver || W. K. Y. Yeung || ALA || align=right | 13 km || 
|-id=967 bgcolor=#fefefe
| 28967 Gerhardter ||  ||  || April 27, 2001 || Socorro || LINEAR || — || align=right | 2.6 km || 
|-id=968 bgcolor=#E9E9E9
| 28968 Gongmiaoxin ||  ||  || April 29, 2001 || Socorro || LINEAR || XIZ || align=right | 3.2 km || 
|-id=969 bgcolor=#E9E9E9
| 28969 Youngminjeongahn ||  ||  || April 25, 2001 || Anderson Mesa || LONEOS || MIT || align=right | 7.8 km || 
|-id=970 bgcolor=#d6d6d6
| 28970 ||  || — || May 15, 2001 || Haleakala || NEAT || EOS || align=right | 6.9 km || 
|-id=971 bgcolor=#fefefe
| 28971 ||  || — || May 18, 2001 || Socorro || LINEAR || — || align=right | 3.4 km || 
|-id=972 bgcolor=#E9E9E9
| 28972 ||  || — || May 22, 2001 || Socorro || LINEAR || EUN || align=right | 3.5 km || 
|-id=973 bgcolor=#E9E9E9
| 28973 ||  || — || May 21, 2001 || Socorro || LINEAR || — || align=right | 4.9 km || 
|-id=974 bgcolor=#E9E9E9
| 28974 ||  || — || May 26, 2001 || Socorro || LINEAR || — || align=right | 4.5 km || 
|-id=975 bgcolor=#E9E9E9
| 28975 ||  || — || May 22, 2001 || Anderson Mesa || LONEOS || — || align=right | 2.8 km || 
|-id=976 bgcolor=#E9E9E9
| 28976 ||  || — || May 24, 2001 || Anderson Mesa || LONEOS || — || align=right | 3.8 km || 
|-id=977 bgcolor=#E9E9E9
| 28977 ||  || — || May 24, 2001 || Socorro || LINEAR || ADE || align=right | 9.4 km || 
|-id=978 bgcolor=#C2E0FF
| 28978 Ixion ||  ||  || May 22, 2001 || Cerro Tololo || DES || plutino || align=right | 844 km || 
|-id=979 bgcolor=#d6d6d6
| 28979 || 2001 LW || — || June 13, 2001 || Socorro || LINEAR || — || align=right | 13 km || 
|-id=980 bgcolor=#fefefe
| 28980 Chowyunfat ||  ||  || June 15, 2001 || Desert Beaver || W. K. Y. Yeung || FLO || align=right | 2.4 km || 
|-id=981 bgcolor=#E9E9E9
| 28981 ||  || — || June 13, 2001 || Socorro || LINEAR || — || align=right | 6.2 km || 
|-id=982 bgcolor=#fefefe
| 28982 ||  || — || June 15, 2001 || Socorro || LINEAR || NYS || align=right | 2.1 km || 
|-id=983 bgcolor=#fefefe
| 28983 Omergranek ||  ||  || June 15, 2001 || Socorro || LINEAR || — || align=right | 2.3 km || 
|-id=984 bgcolor=#d6d6d6
| 28984 ||  || — || June 16, 2001 || Palomar || NEAT || EOS || align=right | 5.3 km || 
|-id=985 bgcolor=#fefefe
| 28985 ||  || — || June 17, 2001 || Palomar || NEAT || — || align=right | 2.9 km || 
|-id=986 bgcolor=#fefefe
| 28986 ||  || — || June 23, 2001 || Palomar || NEAT || V || align=right | 2.1 km || 
|-id=987 bgcolor=#fefefe
| 28987 ||  || — || June 28, 2001 || Anderson Mesa || LONEOS || — || align=right | 1.7 km || 
|-id=988 bgcolor=#fefefe
| 28988 ||  || — || June 27, 2001 || Haleakala || NEAT || — || align=right | 1.5 km || 
|-id=989 bgcolor=#fefefe
| 28989 ||  || — || June 16, 2001 || Anderson Mesa || LONEOS || — || align=right | 7.5 km || 
|-id=990 bgcolor=#d6d6d6
| 28990 Ariheinze ||  ||  || June 20, 2001 || Anderson Mesa || LONEOS || URS || align=right | 12 km || 
|-id=991 bgcolor=#d6d6d6
| 28991 ||  || — || June 21, 2001 || Socorro || LINEAR || EOS || align=right | 10 km || 
|-id=992 bgcolor=#fefefe
| 28992 ||  || — || June 27, 2001 || Anderson Mesa || LONEOS || MAS || align=right | 1.7 km || 
|-id=993 bgcolor=#fefefe
| 28993 ||  || — || July 13, 2001 || Haleakala || NEAT || NYS || align=right | 1.6 km || 
|-id=994 bgcolor=#E9E9E9
| 28994 ||  || — || July 17, 2001 || Anderson Mesa || LONEOS || — || align=right | 5.7 km || 
|-id=995 bgcolor=#E9E9E9
| 28995 ||  || — || July 16, 2001 || Anderson Mesa || LONEOS || — || align=right | 2.9 km || 
|-id=996 bgcolor=#E9E9E9
| 28996 ||  || — || July 21, 2001 || Palomar || NEAT || — || align=right | 5.3 km || 
|-id=997 bgcolor=#E9E9E9
| 28997 || 2020 P-L || — || September 24, 1960 || Palomar || PLS || — || align=right | 3.2 km || 
|-id=998 bgcolor=#E9E9E9
| 28998 || 2184 P-L || — || September 24, 1960 || Palomar || PLS || — || align=right | 3.7 km || 
|-id=999 bgcolor=#fefefe
| 28999 || 2505 P-L || — || September 24, 1960 || Palomar || PLS || — || align=right | 2.4 km || 
|-id=000 bgcolor=#E9E9E9
| 29000 || 2607 P-L || — || September 24, 1960 || Palomar || PLS || — || align=right | 4.5 km || 
|}

References

External links 
 Discovery Circumstances: Numbered Minor Planets (25001)–(30000) (IAU Minor Planet Center)

0028